

209001–209100 

|-bgcolor=#d6d6d6
| 209001 ||  || — || January 26, 2003 || Palomar || NEAT || — || align=right | 3.0 km || 
|-id=002 bgcolor=#d6d6d6
| 209002 ||  || — || January 26, 2003 || Haleakala || NEAT || — || align=right | 7.3 km || 
|-id=003 bgcolor=#d6d6d6
| 209003 ||  || — || January 27, 2003 || Socorro || LINEAR || — || align=right | 5.2 km || 
|-id=004 bgcolor=#d6d6d6
| 209004 ||  || — || January 26, 2003 || Anderson Mesa || LONEOS || — || align=right | 5.7 km || 
|-id=005 bgcolor=#d6d6d6
| 209005 ||  || — || January 26, 2003 || Haleakala || NEAT || — || align=right | 3.7 km || 
|-id=006 bgcolor=#d6d6d6
| 209006 ||  || — || January 27, 2003 || Haleakala || NEAT || TIR || align=right | 4.5 km || 
|-id=007 bgcolor=#d6d6d6
| 209007 ||  || — || January 26, 2003 || Kitt Peak || Spacewatch || — || align=right | 5.1 km || 
|-id=008 bgcolor=#d6d6d6
| 209008 ||  || — || January 27, 2003 || Socorro || LINEAR || — || align=right | 3.9 km || 
|-id=009 bgcolor=#d6d6d6
| 209009 ||  || — || January 27, 2003 || Socorro || LINEAR || — || align=right | 4.4 km || 
|-id=010 bgcolor=#d6d6d6
| 209010 ||  || — || January 30, 2003 || Anderson Mesa || LONEOS || EUP || align=right | 7.0 km || 
|-id=011 bgcolor=#d6d6d6
| 209011 ||  || — || January 29, 2003 || Palomar || NEAT || — || align=right | 4.3 km || 
|-id=012 bgcolor=#d6d6d6
| 209012 ||  || — || January 29, 2003 || Palomar || NEAT || URS || align=right | 5.4 km || 
|-id=013 bgcolor=#d6d6d6
| 209013 ||  || — || January 26, 2003 || Kitt Peak || Spacewatch || — || align=right | 4.5 km || 
|-id=014 bgcolor=#d6d6d6
| 209014 ||  || — || January 24, 2003 || Palomar || NEAT || — || align=right | 5.5 km || 
|-id=015 bgcolor=#d6d6d6
| 209015 ||  || — || February 4, 2003 || Palomar || NEAT || — || align=right | 6.8 km || 
|-id=016 bgcolor=#d6d6d6
| 209016 ||  || — || February 8, 2003 || Anderson Mesa || LONEOS || ALA || align=right | 7.0 km || 
|-id=017 bgcolor=#d6d6d6
| 209017 || 2003 DQ || — || February 20, 2003 || Haleakala || NEAT || — || align=right | 4.8 km || 
|-id=018 bgcolor=#d6d6d6
| 209018 ||  || — || February 22, 2003 || Palomar || NEAT || — || align=right | 4.9 km || 
|-id=019 bgcolor=#d6d6d6
| 209019 ||  || — || February 23, 2003 || Anderson Mesa || LONEOS || — || align=right | 4.3 km || 
|-id=020 bgcolor=#d6d6d6
| 209020 ||  || — || March 6, 2003 || Palomar || NEAT || — || align=right | 4.7 km || 
|-id=021 bgcolor=#d6d6d6
| 209021 ||  || — || March 7, 2003 || Palomar || NEAT || — || align=right | 4.7 km || 
|-id=022 bgcolor=#d6d6d6
| 209022 ||  || — || March 7, 2003 || Palomar || NEAT || ALA || align=right | 5.8 km || 
|-id=023 bgcolor=#d6d6d6
| 209023 ||  || — || March 7, 2003 || Anderson Mesa || LONEOS || — || align=right | 4.9 km || 
|-id=024 bgcolor=#d6d6d6
| 209024 ||  || — || March 9, 2003 || Anderson Mesa || LONEOS || — || align=right | 4.8 km || 
|-id=025 bgcolor=#d6d6d6
| 209025 ||  || — || March 11, 2003 || Kitt Peak || Spacewatch || SYL7:4 || align=right | 7.7 km || 
|-id=026 bgcolor=#d6d6d6
| 209026 ||  || — || March 25, 2003 || Kitt Peak || Spacewatch || — || align=right | 3.5 km || 
|-id=027 bgcolor=#d6d6d6
| 209027 ||  || — || March 24, 2003 || Kitt Peak || Spacewatch || — || align=right | 4.4 km || 
|-id=028 bgcolor=#d6d6d6
| 209028 ||  || — || March 31, 2003 || Socorro || LINEAR || EUP || align=right | 7.3 km || 
|-id=029 bgcolor=#d6d6d6
| 209029 ||  || — || April 2, 2003 || Palomar || NEAT || LUT || align=right | 6.7 km || 
|-id=030 bgcolor=#fefefe
| 209030 ||  || — || April 25, 2003 || Anderson Mesa || LONEOS || — || align=right | 1.1 km || 
|-id=031 bgcolor=#d6d6d6
| 209031 ||  || — || April 26, 2003 || Kitt Peak || Spacewatch || 3:2 || align=right | 6.4 km || 
|-id=032 bgcolor=#fefefe
| 209032 ||  || — || April 29, 2003 || Kitt Peak || Spacewatch || — || align=right data-sort-value="0.94" | 940 m || 
|-id=033 bgcolor=#fefefe
| 209033 ||  || — || May 1, 2003 || Kitt Peak || Spacewatch || FLO || align=right | 1.0 km || 
|-id=034 bgcolor=#fefefe
| 209034 ||  || — || May 25, 2003 || Kitt Peak || Spacewatch || — || align=right data-sort-value="0.95" | 950 m || 
|-id=035 bgcolor=#FA8072
| 209035 ||  || — || July 2, 2003 || Reedy Creek || J. Broughton || — || align=right | 1.6 km || 
|-id=036 bgcolor=#fefefe
| 209036 ||  || — || July 3, 2003 || Kitt Peak || Spacewatch || — || align=right data-sort-value="0.98" | 980 m || 
|-id=037 bgcolor=#fefefe
| 209037 ||  || — || July 22, 2003 || Campo Imperatore || CINEOS || MAS || align=right | 1.3 km || 
|-id=038 bgcolor=#fefefe
| 209038 ||  || — || July 22, 2003 || Haleakala || NEAT || — || align=right | 1.5 km || 
|-id=039 bgcolor=#fefefe
| 209039 ||  || — || July 25, 2003 || Socorro || LINEAR || NYS || align=right data-sort-value="0.93" | 930 m || 
|-id=040 bgcolor=#fefefe
| 209040 ||  || — || July 25, 2003 || Socorro || LINEAR || NYS || align=right data-sort-value="0.97" | 970 m || 
|-id=041 bgcolor=#fefefe
| 209041 ||  || — || July 29, 2003 || Reedy Creek || J. Broughton || — || align=right | 1.0 km || 
|-id=042 bgcolor=#fefefe
| 209042 ||  || — || July 25, 2003 || Palomar || NEAT || PHO || align=right | 4.2 km || 
|-id=043 bgcolor=#fefefe
| 209043 ||  || — || July 30, 2003 || Campo Imperatore || CINEOS || V || align=right data-sort-value="0.86" | 860 m || 
|-id=044 bgcolor=#fefefe
| 209044 ||  || — || August 2, 2003 || Haleakala || NEAT || — || align=right | 1.0 km || 
|-id=045 bgcolor=#fefefe
| 209045 ||  || — || August 2, 2003 || Reedy Creek || J. Broughton || KLI || align=right | 3.6 km || 
|-id=046 bgcolor=#fefefe
| 209046 || 2003 QP || — || August 18, 2003 || Campo Imperatore || CINEOS || — || align=right data-sort-value="0.92" | 920 m || 
|-id=047 bgcolor=#fefefe
| 209047 ||  || — || August 19, 2003 || Campo Imperatore || CINEOS || — || align=right data-sort-value="0.96" | 960 m || 
|-id=048 bgcolor=#fefefe
| 209048 ||  || — || August 19, 2003 || Campo Imperatore || CINEOS || — || align=right | 1.2 km || 
|-id=049 bgcolor=#fefefe
| 209049 ||  || — || August 20, 2003 || Reedy Creek || J. Broughton || — || align=right | 1.3 km || 
|-id=050 bgcolor=#fefefe
| 209050 ||  || — || August 20, 2003 || Haleakala || NEAT || — || align=right | 1.8 km || 
|-id=051 bgcolor=#fefefe
| 209051 ||  || — || August 20, 2003 || Campo Imperatore || CINEOS || — || align=right | 1.4 km || 
|-id=052 bgcolor=#fefefe
| 209052 ||  || — || August 22, 2003 || Palomar || NEAT || — || align=right | 1.2 km || 
|-id=053 bgcolor=#fefefe
| 209053 ||  || — || August 21, 2003 || Palomar || NEAT || — || align=right | 1.2 km || 
|-id=054 bgcolor=#fefefe
| 209054 Lombkató ||  ||  || August 23, 2003 || Piszkéstető || K. Sárneczky, B. Sipőcz || — || align=right | 1.00 km || 
|-id=055 bgcolor=#fefefe
| 209055 ||  || — || August 22, 2003 || Palomar || NEAT || — || align=right | 1.2 km || 
|-id=056 bgcolor=#fefefe
| 209056 ||  || — || August 22, 2003 || Socorro || LINEAR || NYS || align=right data-sort-value="0.98" | 980 m || 
|-id=057 bgcolor=#fefefe
| 209057 ||  || — || August 22, 2003 || Socorro || LINEAR || MAS || align=right | 1.1 km || 
|-id=058 bgcolor=#fefefe
| 209058 ||  || — || August 22, 2003 || Socorro || LINEAR || — || align=right | 1.1 km || 
|-id=059 bgcolor=#fefefe
| 209059 ||  || — || August 23, 2003 || Palomar || NEAT || NYS || align=right data-sort-value="0.89" | 890 m || 
|-id=060 bgcolor=#fefefe
| 209060 ||  || — || August 22, 2003 || Palomar || NEAT || V || align=right | 1.3 km || 
|-id=061 bgcolor=#fefefe
| 209061 ||  || — || August 22, 2003 || Palomar || NEAT || NYS || align=right data-sort-value="0.85" | 850 m || 
|-id=062 bgcolor=#E9E9E9
| 209062 ||  || — || August 23, 2003 || Socorro || LINEAR || — || align=right | 1.7 km || 
|-id=063 bgcolor=#fefefe
| 209063 ||  || — || August 23, 2003 || Socorro || LINEAR || — || align=right | 1.3 km || 
|-id=064 bgcolor=#E9E9E9
| 209064 ||  || — || August 25, 2003 || Palomar || NEAT || — || align=right | 1.3 km || 
|-id=065 bgcolor=#fefefe
| 209065 ||  || — || August 22, 2003 || Socorro || LINEAR || V || align=right data-sort-value="0.87" | 870 m || 
|-id=066 bgcolor=#E9E9E9
| 209066 ||  || — || August 26, 2003 || Kleť || Kleť Obs. || — || align=right | 1.4 km || 
|-id=067 bgcolor=#fefefe
| 209067 ||  || — || August 25, 2003 || Socorro || LINEAR || NYS || align=right | 1.0 km || 
|-id=068 bgcolor=#fefefe
| 209068 ||  || — || August 25, 2003 || Socorro || LINEAR || NYS || align=right | 1.0 km || 
|-id=069 bgcolor=#fefefe
| 209069 ||  || — || August 25, 2003 || Socorro || LINEAR || — || align=right | 1.1 km || 
|-id=070 bgcolor=#fefefe
| 209070 ||  || — || August 28, 2003 || Socorro || LINEAR || V || align=right data-sort-value="0.96" | 960 m || 
|-id=071 bgcolor=#fefefe
| 209071 ||  || — || August 29, 2003 || Socorro || LINEAR || NYS || align=right data-sort-value="0.88" | 880 m || 
|-id=072 bgcolor=#fefefe
| 209072 ||  || — || August 31, 2003 || Kitt Peak || Spacewatch || V || align=right | 1.1 km || 
|-id=073 bgcolor=#fefefe
| 209073 ||  || — || August 31, 2003 || Kitt Peak || Spacewatch || — || align=right | 1.4 km || 
|-id=074 bgcolor=#fefefe
| 209074 ||  || — || August 25, 2003 || Socorro || LINEAR || V || align=right | 1.1 km || 
|-id=075 bgcolor=#E9E9E9
| 209075 ||  || — || August 23, 2003 || Cerro Tololo || M. W. Buie || EUN || align=right | 1.7 km || 
|-id=076 bgcolor=#fefefe
| 209076 ||  || — || September 14, 2003 || Haleakala || NEAT || V || align=right data-sort-value="0.98" | 980 m || 
|-id=077 bgcolor=#fefefe
| 209077 ||  || — || September 15, 2003 || Anderson Mesa || LONEOS || NYS || align=right | 2.6 km || 
|-id=078 bgcolor=#fefefe
| 209078 ||  || — || September 16, 2003 || Kitt Peak || Spacewatch || V || align=right | 1.2 km || 
|-id=079 bgcolor=#fefefe
| 209079 ||  || — || September 17, 2003 || Kitt Peak || Spacewatch || — || align=right | 1.3 km || 
|-id=080 bgcolor=#fefefe
| 209080 ||  || — || September 16, 2003 || Kitt Peak || Spacewatch || MAS || align=right | 1.0 km || 
|-id=081 bgcolor=#fefefe
| 209081 ||  || — || September 17, 2003 || Kitt Peak || Spacewatch || — || align=right | 1.1 km || 
|-id=082 bgcolor=#fefefe
| 209082 ||  || — || September 17, 2003 || Kitt Peak || Spacewatch || V || align=right data-sort-value="0.87" | 870 m || 
|-id=083 bgcolor=#E9E9E9
| 209083 Rioja ||  ||  || September 17, 2003 || Heppenheim || F. Hormuth || — || align=right | 2.0 km || 
|-id=084 bgcolor=#fefefe
| 209084 ||  || — || September 17, 2003 || Haleakala || NEAT || — || align=right | 1.6 km || 
|-id=085 bgcolor=#fefefe
| 209085 ||  || — || September 17, 2003 || Haleakala || NEAT || — || align=right | 1.2 km || 
|-id=086 bgcolor=#E9E9E9
| 209086 ||  || — || September 18, 2003 || Palomar || NEAT || — || align=right | 1.5 km || 
|-id=087 bgcolor=#E9E9E9
| 209087 ||  || — || September 18, 2003 || Kitt Peak || Spacewatch || — || align=right | 1.0 km || 
|-id=088 bgcolor=#fefefe
| 209088 ||  || — || September 18, 2003 || Kitt Peak || Spacewatch || MAS || align=right data-sort-value="0.88" | 880 m || 
|-id=089 bgcolor=#fefefe
| 209089 ||  || — || September 18, 2003 || Piszkéstető || K. Sárneczky, B. Sipőcz || V || align=right data-sort-value="0.78" | 780 m || 
|-id=090 bgcolor=#E9E9E9
| 209090 ||  || — || September 18, 2003 || Socorro || LINEAR || — || align=right | 2.1 km || 
|-id=091 bgcolor=#fefefe
| 209091 ||  || — || September 16, 2003 || Palomar || NEAT || V || align=right data-sort-value="0.75" | 750 m || 
|-id=092 bgcolor=#E9E9E9
| 209092 ||  || — || September 16, 2003 || Palomar || NEAT || — || align=right | 2.2 km || 
|-id=093 bgcolor=#E9E9E9
| 209093 ||  || — || September 17, 2003 || Palomar || NEAT || — || align=right | 2.4 km || 
|-id=094 bgcolor=#E9E9E9
| 209094 ||  || — || September 17, 2003 || Palomar || NEAT || — || align=right | 2.8 km || 
|-id=095 bgcolor=#fefefe
| 209095 ||  || — || September 16, 2003 || Anderson Mesa || LONEOS || — || align=right | 1.3 km || 
|-id=096 bgcolor=#fefefe
| 209096 ||  || — || September 18, 2003 || Palomar || NEAT || V || align=right data-sort-value="0.93" | 930 m || 
|-id=097 bgcolor=#fefefe
| 209097 ||  || — || September 18, 2003 || Palomar || NEAT || — || align=right | 2.2 km || 
|-id=098 bgcolor=#fefefe
| 209098 ||  || — || September 16, 2003 || Anderson Mesa || LONEOS || V || align=right data-sort-value="0.95" | 950 m || 
|-id=099 bgcolor=#fefefe
| 209099 ||  || — || September 16, 2003 || Anderson Mesa || LONEOS || — || align=right | 1.2 km || 
|-id=100 bgcolor=#E9E9E9
| 209100 ||  || — || September 16, 2003 || Kitt Peak || Spacewatch || JUN || align=right | 1.5 km || 
|}

209101–209200 

|-bgcolor=#fefefe
| 209101 ||  || — || September 16, 2003 || Kitt Peak || Spacewatch || V || align=right data-sort-value="0.90" | 900 m || 
|-id=102 bgcolor=#fefefe
| 209102 ||  || — || September 17, 2003 || Kitt Peak || Spacewatch || — || align=right | 1.3 km || 
|-id=103 bgcolor=#E9E9E9
| 209103 ||  || — || September 18, 2003 || Kitt Peak || Spacewatch || — || align=right | 1.6 km || 
|-id=104 bgcolor=#fefefe
| 209104 ||  || — || September 18, 2003 || Kitt Peak || Spacewatch || — || align=right | 1.1 km || 
|-id=105 bgcolor=#E9E9E9
| 209105 ||  || — || September 20, 2003 || Palomar || NEAT || — || align=right | 2.1 km || 
|-id=106 bgcolor=#fefefe
| 209106 ||  || — || September 20, 2003 || Palomar || NEAT || — || align=right | 1.1 km || 
|-id=107 bgcolor=#fefefe
| 209107 Šafránek ||  ||  || September 16, 2003 || Kleť || KLENOT || — || align=right | 1.3 km || 
|-id=108 bgcolor=#fefefe
| 209108 ||  || — || September 17, 2003 || Kitt Peak || Spacewatch || — || align=right | 1.4 km || 
|-id=109 bgcolor=#fefefe
| 209109 ||  || — || September 17, 2003 || Kitt Peak || Spacewatch || — || align=right | 1.0 km || 
|-id=110 bgcolor=#fefefe
| 209110 ||  || — || September 21, 2003 || Desert Eagle || W. K. Y. Yeung || — || align=right | 1.3 km || 
|-id=111 bgcolor=#fefefe
| 209111 ||  || — || September 19, 2003 || Kitt Peak || Spacewatch || MAS || align=right | 1.1 km || 
|-id=112 bgcolor=#E9E9E9
| 209112 ||  || — || September 20, 2003 || Palomar || NEAT || JUN || align=right | 1.4 km || 
|-id=113 bgcolor=#fefefe
| 209113 ||  || — || September 19, 2003 || Anderson Mesa || LONEOS || NYS || align=right | 1.2 km || 
|-id=114 bgcolor=#E9E9E9
| 209114 ||  || — || September 19, 2003 || Anderson Mesa || LONEOS || — || align=right | 1.3 km || 
|-id=115 bgcolor=#E9E9E9
| 209115 ||  || — || September 20, 2003 || Anderson Mesa || LONEOS || — || align=right | 1.3 km || 
|-id=116 bgcolor=#E9E9E9
| 209116 ||  || — || September 23, 2003 || Haleakala || NEAT || — || align=right | 1.5 km || 
|-id=117 bgcolor=#fefefe
| 209117 ||  || — || September 18, 2003 || Socorro || LINEAR || NYS || align=right | 2.5 km || 
|-id=118 bgcolor=#fefefe
| 209118 ||  || — || September 18, 2003 || Kitt Peak || Spacewatch || — || align=right data-sort-value="0.94" | 940 m || 
|-id=119 bgcolor=#fefefe
| 209119 ||  || — || September 18, 2003 || Kitt Peak || Spacewatch || — || align=right | 1.0 km || 
|-id=120 bgcolor=#fefefe
| 209120 ||  || — || September 19, 2003 || Palomar || NEAT || V || align=right | 1.3 km || 
|-id=121 bgcolor=#fefefe
| 209121 ||  || — || September 19, 2003 || Socorro || LINEAR || — || align=right | 1.1 km || 
|-id=122 bgcolor=#fefefe
| 209122 ||  || — || September 19, 2003 || Socorro || LINEAR || — || align=right | 1.1 km || 
|-id=123 bgcolor=#fefefe
| 209123 ||  || — || September 21, 2003 || Kitt Peak || Spacewatch || SUL || align=right | 2.6 km || 
|-id=124 bgcolor=#fefefe
| 209124 ||  || — || September 22, 2003 || Anderson Mesa || LONEOS || — || align=right | 1.2 km || 
|-id=125 bgcolor=#fefefe
| 209125 ||  || — || September 20, 2003 || Campo Imperatore || CINEOS || V || align=right | 1.3 km || 
|-id=126 bgcolor=#E9E9E9
| 209126 ||  || — || September 22, 2003 || Kitt Peak || Spacewatch || — || align=right | 2.1 km || 
|-id=127 bgcolor=#E9E9E9
| 209127 ||  || — || September 22, 2003 || Socorro || LINEAR || — || align=right | 2.4 km || 
|-id=128 bgcolor=#E9E9E9
| 209128 ||  || — || September 23, 2003 || Palomar || NEAT || — || align=right | 1.2 km || 
|-id=129 bgcolor=#fefefe
| 209129 ||  || — || September 27, 2003 || Kitt Peak || Spacewatch || — || align=right data-sort-value="0.98" | 980 m || 
|-id=130 bgcolor=#fefefe
| 209130 ||  || — || September 24, 2003 || Palomar || NEAT || V || align=right | 1.1 km || 
|-id=131 bgcolor=#E9E9E9
| 209131 ||  || — || September 24, 2003 || Palomar || NEAT || — || align=right | 1.5 km || 
|-id=132 bgcolor=#E9E9E9
| 209132 ||  || — || September 26, 2003 || Socorro || LINEAR || — || align=right | 1.2 km || 
|-id=133 bgcolor=#E9E9E9
| 209133 ||  || — || September 26, 2003 || Socorro || LINEAR || — || align=right | 1.1 km || 
|-id=134 bgcolor=#fefefe
| 209134 ||  || — || September 28, 2003 || Kitt Peak || Spacewatch || MAS || align=right data-sort-value="0.92" | 920 m || 
|-id=135 bgcolor=#fefefe
| 209135 ||  || — || September 26, 2003 || Socorro || LINEAR || — || align=right | 1.3 km || 
|-id=136 bgcolor=#fefefe
| 209136 ||  || — || September 26, 2003 || Socorro || LINEAR || NYS || align=right | 1.2 km || 
|-id=137 bgcolor=#fefefe
| 209137 ||  || — || September 26, 2003 || Socorro || LINEAR || V || align=right | 1.0 km || 
|-id=138 bgcolor=#E9E9E9
| 209138 ||  || — || September 27, 2003 || Kitt Peak || Spacewatch || — || align=right | 1.2 km || 
|-id=139 bgcolor=#E9E9E9
| 209139 ||  || — || September 28, 2003 || Kitt Peak || Spacewatch || — || align=right | 1.4 km || 
|-id=140 bgcolor=#fefefe
| 209140 ||  || — || September 27, 2003 || Socorro || LINEAR || NYS || align=right data-sort-value="0.95" | 950 m || 
|-id=141 bgcolor=#E9E9E9
| 209141 ||  || — || September 27, 2003 || Socorro || LINEAR || — || align=right | 1.7 km || 
|-id=142 bgcolor=#fefefe
| 209142 ||  || — || September 28, 2003 || Anderson Mesa || LONEOS || V || align=right | 1.1 km || 
|-id=143 bgcolor=#E9E9E9
| 209143 ||  || — || September 29, 2003 || Kitt Peak || Spacewatch || — || align=right | 1.6 km || 
|-id=144 bgcolor=#fefefe
| 209144 ||  || — || September 28, 2003 || Anderson Mesa || LONEOS || — || align=right | 1.4 km || 
|-id=145 bgcolor=#E9E9E9
| 209145 ||  || — || September 28, 2003 || Kitt Peak || Spacewatch || — || align=right | 1.0 km || 
|-id=146 bgcolor=#fefefe
| 209146 ||  || — || September 29, 2003 || Anderson Mesa || LONEOS || — || align=right | 1.1 km || 
|-id=147 bgcolor=#E9E9E9
| 209147 ||  || — || September 17, 2003 || Palomar || NEAT || — || align=right | 1.4 km || 
|-id=148 bgcolor=#fefefe
| 209148 Dustindeford ||  ||  || September 27, 2003 || Apache Point || SDSS || — || align=right | 1.5 km || 
|-id=149 bgcolor=#E9E9E9
| 209149 Chrismackenzie ||  ||  || September 29, 2003 || Apache Point || SDSS || — || align=right data-sort-value="0.83" | 830 m || 
|-id=150 bgcolor=#fefefe
| 209150 ||  || — || October 1, 2003 || Anderson Mesa || LONEOS || — || align=right | 1.3 km || 
|-id=151 bgcolor=#fefefe
| 209151 ||  || — || October 1, 2003 || Kitt Peak || Spacewatch || — || align=right | 1.5 km || 
|-id=152 bgcolor=#E9E9E9
| 209152 ||  || — || October 5, 2003 || Kitt Peak || Spacewatch || — || align=right | 2.9 km || 
|-id=153 bgcolor=#E9E9E9
| 209153 ||  || — || October 16, 2003 || Kitt Peak || Spacewatch || — || align=right | 3.8 km || 
|-id=154 bgcolor=#E9E9E9
| 209154 ||  || — || October 17, 2003 || Socorro || LINEAR || — || align=right | 1.9 km || 
|-id=155 bgcolor=#fefefe
| 209155 ||  || — || October 20, 2003 || Emerald Lane || L. Ball || V || align=right | 1.4 km || 
|-id=156 bgcolor=#E9E9E9
| 209156 ||  || — || October 19, 2003 || Anderson Mesa || LONEOS || — || align=right | 3.4 km || 
|-id=157 bgcolor=#E9E9E9
| 209157 ||  || — || October 16, 2003 || Anderson Mesa || LONEOS || — || align=right | 2.8 km || 
|-id=158 bgcolor=#E9E9E9
| 209158 ||  || — || October 23, 2003 || Kvistaberg || UDAS || — || align=right | 1.6 km || 
|-id=159 bgcolor=#E9E9E9
| 209159 ||  || — || October 16, 2003 || Črni Vrh || Črni Vrh || — || align=right | 2.6 km || 
|-id=160 bgcolor=#E9E9E9
| 209160 ||  || — || October 18, 2003 || Palomar || NEAT || — || align=right | 1.6 km || 
|-id=161 bgcolor=#E9E9E9
| 209161 ||  || — || October 18, 2003 || Palomar || NEAT || MAR || align=right | 1.4 km || 
|-id=162 bgcolor=#E9E9E9
| 209162 ||  || — || October 19, 2003 || Goodricke-Pigott || R. A. Tucker || — || align=right | 1.5 km || 
|-id=163 bgcolor=#fefefe
| 209163 ||  || — || October 22, 2003 || Kitt Peak || Spacewatch || MAS || align=right | 1.1 km || 
|-id=164 bgcolor=#E9E9E9
| 209164 ||  || — || October 19, 2003 || Palomar || NEAT || — || align=right | 2.4 km || 
|-id=165 bgcolor=#E9E9E9
| 209165 ||  || — || October 18, 2003 || Palomar || NEAT || — || align=right | 1.8 km || 
|-id=166 bgcolor=#fefefe
| 209166 ||  || — || October 20, 2003 || Palomar || NEAT || — || align=right | 1.6 km || 
|-id=167 bgcolor=#E9E9E9
| 209167 ||  || — || October 18, 2003 || Kitt Peak || Spacewatch || MIS || align=right | 2.2 km || 
|-id=168 bgcolor=#E9E9E9
| 209168 ||  || — || October 19, 2003 || Kitt Peak || Spacewatch || — || align=right | 1.9 km || 
|-id=169 bgcolor=#E9E9E9
| 209169 ||  || — || October 19, 2003 || Kitt Peak || Spacewatch || — || align=right | 2.4 km || 
|-id=170 bgcolor=#fefefe
| 209170 ||  || — || October 19, 2003 || Haleakala || NEAT || NYS || align=right | 2.9 km || 
|-id=171 bgcolor=#E9E9E9
| 209171 ||  || — || October 20, 2003 || Kitt Peak || Spacewatch || — || align=right | 1.7 km || 
|-id=172 bgcolor=#E9E9E9
| 209172 ||  || — || October 20, 2003 || Palomar || NEAT || — || align=right | 2.0 km || 
|-id=173 bgcolor=#E9E9E9
| 209173 ||  || — || October 18, 2003 || Kitt Peak || Spacewatch || — || align=right | 1.5 km || 
|-id=174 bgcolor=#E9E9E9
| 209174 ||  || — || October 19, 2003 || Kitt Peak || Spacewatch || EUN || align=right | 1.9 km || 
|-id=175 bgcolor=#E9E9E9
| 209175 ||  || — || October 20, 2003 || Kitt Peak || Spacewatch || — || align=right | 1.4 km || 
|-id=176 bgcolor=#fefefe
| 209176 ||  || — || October 16, 2003 || Anderson Mesa || LONEOS || — || align=right | 1.3 km || 
|-id=177 bgcolor=#E9E9E9
| 209177 ||  || — || October 18, 2003 || Anderson Mesa || LONEOS || — || align=right | 2.2 km || 
|-id=178 bgcolor=#fefefe
| 209178 ||  || — || October 20, 2003 || Socorro || LINEAR || — || align=right | 1.0 km || 
|-id=179 bgcolor=#fefefe
| 209179 ||  || — || October 21, 2003 || Kitt Peak || Spacewatch || — || align=right | 1.6 km || 
|-id=180 bgcolor=#E9E9E9
| 209180 ||  || — || October 20, 2003 || Kitt Peak || Spacewatch || — || align=right | 1.9 km || 
|-id=181 bgcolor=#E9E9E9
| 209181 ||  || — || October 21, 2003 || Socorro || LINEAR || — || align=right | 2.0 km || 
|-id=182 bgcolor=#E9E9E9
| 209182 ||  || — || October 22, 2003 || Socorro || LINEAR || — || align=right | 2.6 km || 
|-id=183 bgcolor=#fefefe
| 209183 ||  || — || October 21, 2003 || Socorro || LINEAR || — || align=right | 1.3 km || 
|-id=184 bgcolor=#E9E9E9
| 209184 ||  || — || October 21, 2003 || Palomar || NEAT || — || align=right | 1.2 km || 
|-id=185 bgcolor=#E9E9E9
| 209185 ||  || — || October 22, 2003 || Socorro || LINEAR || — || align=right | 2.8 km || 
|-id=186 bgcolor=#E9E9E9
| 209186 ||  || — || October 23, 2003 || Anderson Mesa || LONEOS || HEN || align=right | 1.4 km || 
|-id=187 bgcolor=#E9E9E9
| 209187 ||  || — || October 20, 2003 || Kitt Peak || Spacewatch || — || align=right | 2.2 km || 
|-id=188 bgcolor=#E9E9E9
| 209188 ||  || — || October 21, 2003 || Socorro || LINEAR || — || align=right | 1.2 km || 
|-id=189 bgcolor=#E9E9E9
| 209189 ||  || — || October 21, 2003 || Kitt Peak || Spacewatch || — || align=right | 1.8 km || 
|-id=190 bgcolor=#E9E9E9
| 209190 ||  || — || October 22, 2003 || Kitt Peak || Spacewatch || — || align=right | 1.5 km || 
|-id=191 bgcolor=#E9E9E9
| 209191 ||  || — || October 23, 2003 || Kitt Peak || Spacewatch || — || align=right | 2.2 km || 
|-id=192 bgcolor=#E9E9E9
| 209192 ||  || — || October 24, 2003 || Socorro || LINEAR || — || align=right | 1.5 km || 
|-id=193 bgcolor=#E9E9E9
| 209193 ||  || — || October 22, 2003 || Kitt Peak || Spacewatch || — || align=right | 1.5 km || 
|-id=194 bgcolor=#E9E9E9
| 209194 ||  || — || October 22, 2003 || Socorro || LINEAR || — || align=right | 5.6 km || 
|-id=195 bgcolor=#E9E9E9
| 209195 ||  || — || October 24, 2003 || Socorro || LINEAR || — || align=right data-sort-value="0.98" | 980 m || 
|-id=196 bgcolor=#fefefe
| 209196 ||  || — || October 24, 2003 || Kitt Peak || Spacewatch || MAS || align=right | 1.1 km || 
|-id=197 bgcolor=#E9E9E9
| 209197 ||  || — || October 25, 2003 || Socorro || LINEAR || HNA || align=right | 3.8 km || 
|-id=198 bgcolor=#E9E9E9
| 209198 ||  || — || October 25, 2003 || Socorro || LINEAR || — || align=right | 1.4 km || 
|-id=199 bgcolor=#E9E9E9
| 209199 ||  || — || October 25, 2003 || Socorro || LINEAR || — || align=right | 1.6 km || 
|-id=200 bgcolor=#fefefe
| 209200 ||  || — || October 28, 2003 || Socorro || LINEAR || — || align=right | 1.5 km || 
|}

209201–209300 

|-bgcolor=#E9E9E9
| 209201 ||  || — || October 28, 2003 || Socorro || LINEAR || HNS || align=right | 1.9 km || 
|-id=202 bgcolor=#E9E9E9
| 209202 ||  || — || October 28, 2003 || Socorro || LINEAR || MIS || align=right | 3.2 km || 
|-id=203 bgcolor=#E9E9E9
| 209203 ||  || — || October 28, 2003 || Haleakala || NEAT || — || align=right | 1.9 km || 
|-id=204 bgcolor=#E9E9E9
| 209204 ||  || — || October 30, 2003 || Socorro || LINEAR || — || align=right | 1.4 km || 
|-id=205 bgcolor=#E9E9E9
| 209205 ||  || — || October 30, 2003 || Socorro || LINEAR || ADE || align=right | 3.8 km || 
|-id=206 bgcolor=#E9E9E9
| 209206 ||  || — || October 23, 2003 || Kitt Peak || M. W. Buie || — || align=right data-sort-value="0.81" | 810 m || 
|-id=207 bgcolor=#E9E9E9
| 209207 ||  || — || October 25, 2003 || Socorro || LINEAR || — || align=right | 1.8 km || 
|-id=208 bgcolor=#E9E9E9
| 209208 ||  || — || October 27, 2003 || Socorro || LINEAR || — || align=right | 2.3 km || 
|-id=209 bgcolor=#fefefe
| 209209 Ericmarsh ||  ||  || October 19, 2003 || Apache Point || SDSS || V || align=right data-sort-value="0.90" | 900 m || 
|-id=210 bgcolor=#fefefe
| 209210 ||  || — || October 22, 2003 || Kitt Peak || Spacewatch || — || align=right | 1.3 km || 
|-id=211 bgcolor=#E9E9E9
| 209211 ||  || — || November 14, 2003 || Palomar || NEAT || — || align=right | 1.1 km || 
|-id=212 bgcolor=#fefefe
| 209212 ||  || — || November 15, 2003 || Kitt Peak || Spacewatch || — || align=right | 1.1 km || 
|-id=213 bgcolor=#E9E9E9
| 209213 ||  || — || November 16, 2003 || Catalina || CSS || MIS || align=right | 3.6 km || 
|-id=214 bgcolor=#E9E9E9
| 209214 ||  || — || November 19, 2003 || Palomar || NEAT || — || align=right | 2.4 km || 
|-id=215 bgcolor=#FFC2E0
| 209215 ||  || — || November 21, 2003 || Kitt Peak || Spacewatch || ATEcritical || align=right data-sort-value="0.051" | 51 m || 
|-id=216 bgcolor=#E9E9E9
| 209216 ||  || — || November 18, 2003 || Kitt Peak || Spacewatch || — || align=right | 1.8 km || 
|-id=217 bgcolor=#E9E9E9
| 209217 ||  || — || November 19, 2003 || Socorro || LINEAR || EUN || align=right | 2.6 km || 
|-id=218 bgcolor=#E9E9E9
| 209218 ||  || — || November 19, 2003 || Kitt Peak || Spacewatch || — || align=right | 2.5 km || 
|-id=219 bgcolor=#E9E9E9
| 209219 ||  || — || November 20, 2003 || Kitt Peak || Spacewatch || — || align=right | 1.8 km || 
|-id=220 bgcolor=#E9E9E9
| 209220 ||  || — || November 20, 2003 || Socorro || LINEAR || — || align=right | 1.4 km || 
|-id=221 bgcolor=#E9E9E9
| 209221 ||  || — || November 19, 2003 || Kitt Peak || Spacewatch || — || align=right | 2.0 km || 
|-id=222 bgcolor=#E9E9E9
| 209222 ||  || — || November 19, 2003 || Kitt Peak || Spacewatch || — || align=right | 2.1 km || 
|-id=223 bgcolor=#E9E9E9
| 209223 ||  || — || November 19, 2003 || Kitt Peak || Spacewatch || WIT || align=right | 1.5 km || 
|-id=224 bgcolor=#E9E9E9
| 209224 ||  || — || November 19, 2003 || Kitt Peak || Spacewatch || — || align=right | 2.5 km || 
|-id=225 bgcolor=#E9E9E9
| 209225 ||  || — || November 20, 2003 || Palomar || NEAT || — || align=right | 2.3 km || 
|-id=226 bgcolor=#E9E9E9
| 209226 ||  || — || November 20, 2003 || Socorro || LINEAR || — || align=right | 2.3 km || 
|-id=227 bgcolor=#E9E9E9
| 209227 ||  || — || November 20, 2003 || Socorro || LINEAR || PAD || align=right | 3.6 km || 
|-id=228 bgcolor=#E9E9E9
| 209228 ||  || — || November 20, 2003 || Socorro || LINEAR || — || align=right | 1.9 km || 
|-id=229 bgcolor=#E9E9E9
| 209229 ||  || — || November 19, 2003 || Socorro || LINEAR || — || align=right | 2.3 km || 
|-id=230 bgcolor=#E9E9E9
| 209230 ||  || — || November 19, 2003 || Palomar || NEAT || — || align=right | 2.7 km || 
|-id=231 bgcolor=#E9E9E9
| 209231 ||  || — || November 20, 2003 || Socorro || LINEAR || — || align=right | 2.2 km || 
|-id=232 bgcolor=#E9E9E9
| 209232 ||  || — || November 21, 2003 || Socorro || LINEAR || — || align=right | 4.1 km || 
|-id=233 bgcolor=#E9E9E9
| 209233 ||  || — || November 19, 2003 || Anderson Mesa || LONEOS || — || align=right | 1.7 km || 
|-id=234 bgcolor=#E9E9E9
| 209234 ||  || — || November 19, 2003 || Anderson Mesa || LONEOS || — || align=right | 2.2 km || 
|-id=235 bgcolor=#E9E9E9
| 209235 ||  || — || November 19, 2003 || Anderson Mesa || LONEOS || — || align=right | 1.6 km || 
|-id=236 bgcolor=#E9E9E9
| 209236 ||  || — || November 20, 2003 || Socorro || LINEAR || — || align=right | 2.0 km || 
|-id=237 bgcolor=#E9E9E9
| 209237 ||  || — || November 21, 2003 || Socorro || LINEAR || JUN || align=right | 1.4 km || 
|-id=238 bgcolor=#E9E9E9
| 209238 ||  || — || November 20, 2003 || Socorro || LINEAR || — || align=right | 1.8 km || 
|-id=239 bgcolor=#E9E9E9
| 209239 ||  || — || November 20, 2003 || Socorro || LINEAR || — || align=right | 1.9 km || 
|-id=240 bgcolor=#E9E9E9
| 209240 ||  || — || November 20, 2003 || Socorro || LINEAR || — || align=right | 1.3 km || 
|-id=241 bgcolor=#E9E9E9
| 209241 ||  || — || November 20, 2003 || Socorro || LINEAR || — || align=right | 1.7 km || 
|-id=242 bgcolor=#E9E9E9
| 209242 ||  || — || November 20, 2003 || Socorro || LINEAR || — || align=right | 2.1 km || 
|-id=243 bgcolor=#E9E9E9
| 209243 ||  || — || November 20, 2003 || Socorro || LINEAR || — || align=right | 2.3 km || 
|-id=244 bgcolor=#E9E9E9
| 209244 ||  || — || November 20, 2003 || Socorro || LINEAR || — || align=right | 2.5 km || 
|-id=245 bgcolor=#E9E9E9
| 209245 ||  || — || November 20, 2003 || Socorro || LINEAR || — || align=right | 3.6 km || 
|-id=246 bgcolor=#E9E9E9
| 209246 ||  || — || November 20, 2003 || Socorro || LINEAR || — || align=right | 1.9 km || 
|-id=247 bgcolor=#E9E9E9
| 209247 ||  || — || November 20, 2003 || Socorro || LINEAR || — || align=right | 1.8 km || 
|-id=248 bgcolor=#E9E9E9
| 209248 ||  || — || November 21, 2003 || Socorro || LINEAR || — || align=right | 1.4 km || 
|-id=249 bgcolor=#E9E9E9
| 209249 ||  || — || November 21, 2003 || Palomar || NEAT || — || align=right | 2.2 km || 
|-id=250 bgcolor=#E9E9E9
| 209250 ||  || — || November 21, 2003 || Socorro || LINEAR || — || align=right | 3.9 km || 
|-id=251 bgcolor=#E9E9E9
| 209251 ||  || — || November 21, 2003 || Socorro || LINEAR || — || align=right | 1.7 km || 
|-id=252 bgcolor=#E9E9E9
| 209252 ||  || — || November 23, 2003 || Catalina || CSS || — || align=right | 2.1 km || 
|-id=253 bgcolor=#E9E9E9
| 209253 ||  || — || November 23, 2003 || Catalina || CSS || — || align=right | 2.2 km || 
|-id=254 bgcolor=#E9E9E9
| 209254 ||  || — || November 24, 2003 || Anderson Mesa || LONEOS || WIT || align=right | 1.3 km || 
|-id=255 bgcolor=#E9E9E9
| 209255 ||  || — || November 28, 2003 || Mallorca || OAM Obs. || — || align=right | 2.8 km || 
|-id=256 bgcolor=#E9E9E9
| 209256 ||  || — || November 26, 2003 || Socorro || LINEAR || HNS || align=right | 3.0 km || 
|-id=257 bgcolor=#E9E9E9
| 209257 ||  || — || November 29, 2003 || Kitt Peak || Spacewatch || — || align=right | 1.5 km || 
|-id=258 bgcolor=#E9E9E9
| 209258 ||  || — || November 30, 2003 || Catalina || CSS || — || align=right | 1.4 km || 
|-id=259 bgcolor=#E9E9E9
| 209259 ||  || — || November 30, 2003 || Kitt Peak || Spacewatch || — || align=right | 1.4 km || 
|-id=260 bgcolor=#E9E9E9
| 209260 ||  || — || November 30, 2003 || Kitt Peak || Spacewatch || — || align=right | 2.5 km || 
|-id=261 bgcolor=#E9E9E9
| 209261 ||  || — || November 19, 2003 || Kitt Peak || Spacewatch || — || align=right | 2.0 km || 
|-id=262 bgcolor=#E9E9E9
| 209262 ||  || — || November 24, 2003 || Socorro || LINEAR || — || align=right | 3.0 km || 
|-id=263 bgcolor=#E9E9E9
| 209263 ||  || — || November 24, 2003 || Socorro || LINEAR || HNS || align=right | 2.1 km || 
|-id=264 bgcolor=#E9E9E9
| 209264 ||  || — || November 19, 2003 || Socorro || LINEAR || — || align=right | 2.2 km || 
|-id=265 bgcolor=#E9E9E9
| 209265 ||  || — || December 1, 2003 || Socorro || LINEAR || — || align=right | 2.8 km || 
|-id=266 bgcolor=#E9E9E9
| 209266 ||  || — || December 1, 2003 || Socorro || LINEAR || — || align=right | 2.2 km || 
|-id=267 bgcolor=#E9E9E9
| 209267 ||  || — || December 3, 2003 || Socorro || LINEAR || — || align=right | 3.9 km || 
|-id=268 bgcolor=#E9E9E9
| 209268 ||  || — || December 4, 2003 || Socorro || LINEAR || MAR || align=right | 1.8 km || 
|-id=269 bgcolor=#E9E9E9
| 209269 ||  || — || December 4, 2003 || Socorro || LINEAR || MAR || align=right | 2.0 km || 
|-id=270 bgcolor=#E9E9E9
| 209270 ||  || — || December 14, 2003 || Palomar || NEAT || 526 || align=right | 3.3 km || 
|-id=271 bgcolor=#E9E9E9
| 209271 ||  || — || December 14, 2003 || Palomar || NEAT || EUN || align=right | 2.1 km || 
|-id=272 bgcolor=#E9E9E9
| 209272 ||  || — || December 15, 2003 || Socorro || LINEAR || HNS || align=right | 1.9 km || 
|-id=273 bgcolor=#E9E9E9
| 209273 ||  || — || December 14, 2003 || Kitt Peak || Spacewatch || — || align=right | 1.7 km || 
|-id=274 bgcolor=#E9E9E9
| 209274 ||  || — || December 1, 2003 || Kitt Peak || Spacewatch || — || align=right | 1.9 km || 
|-id=275 bgcolor=#E9E9E9
| 209275 ||  || — || December 16, 2003 || Catalina || CSS || — || align=right | 2.2 km || 
|-id=276 bgcolor=#E9E9E9
| 209276 ||  || — || December 17, 2003 || Socorro || LINEAR || GEF || align=right | 1.9 km || 
|-id=277 bgcolor=#E9E9E9
| 209277 ||  || — || December 17, 2003 || Kitt Peak || Spacewatch || — || align=right | 1.9 km || 
|-id=278 bgcolor=#E9E9E9
| 209278 ||  || — || December 17, 2003 || Anderson Mesa || LONEOS || — || align=right | 3.7 km || 
|-id=279 bgcolor=#E9E9E9
| 209279 ||  || — || December 17, 2003 || Anderson Mesa || LONEOS || — || align=right | 2.5 km || 
|-id=280 bgcolor=#E9E9E9
| 209280 ||  || — || December 17, 2003 || Kitt Peak || Spacewatch || — || align=right | 2.6 km || 
|-id=281 bgcolor=#d6d6d6
| 209281 ||  || — || December 16, 2003 || Anderson Mesa || LONEOS || EUP || align=right | 8.5 km || 
|-id=282 bgcolor=#E9E9E9
| 209282 ||  || — || December 17, 2003 || Kitt Peak || Spacewatch || — || align=right | 3.5 km || 
|-id=283 bgcolor=#E9E9E9
| 209283 ||  || — || December 17, 2003 || Palomar || NEAT || DOR || align=right | 4.5 km || 
|-id=284 bgcolor=#E9E9E9
| 209284 ||  || — || December 18, 2003 || Socorro || LINEAR || HEN || align=right | 2.1 km || 
|-id=285 bgcolor=#E9E9E9
| 209285 ||  || — || December 19, 2003 || Kitt Peak || Spacewatch || — || align=right | 2.9 km || 
|-id=286 bgcolor=#d6d6d6
| 209286 ||  || — || December 19, 2003 || Kitt Peak || Spacewatch || KOR || align=right | 1.7 km || 
|-id=287 bgcolor=#E9E9E9
| 209287 ||  || — || December 19, 2003 || Socorro || LINEAR || — || align=right | 3.7 km || 
|-id=288 bgcolor=#E9E9E9
| 209288 ||  || — || December 18, 2003 || Socorro || LINEAR || — || align=right | 1.8 km || 
|-id=289 bgcolor=#E9E9E9
| 209289 ||  || — || December 19, 2003 || Socorro || LINEAR || — || align=right | 1.9 km || 
|-id=290 bgcolor=#E9E9E9
| 209290 ||  || — || December 19, 2003 || Socorro || LINEAR || — || align=right | 2.6 km || 
|-id=291 bgcolor=#E9E9E9
| 209291 ||  || — || December 20, 2003 || Socorro || LINEAR || GEF || align=right | 2.2 km || 
|-id=292 bgcolor=#E9E9E9
| 209292 ||  || — || December 18, 2003 || Socorro || LINEAR || — || align=right | 3.6 km || 
|-id=293 bgcolor=#E9E9E9
| 209293 ||  || — || December 19, 2003 || Socorro || LINEAR || — || align=right | 2.8 km || 
|-id=294 bgcolor=#E9E9E9
| 209294 ||  || — || December 19, 2003 || Kitt Peak || Spacewatch || — || align=right | 3.4 km || 
|-id=295 bgcolor=#E9E9E9
| 209295 ||  || — || December 22, 2003 || Kitt Peak || Spacewatch || MRX || align=right | 1.6 km || 
|-id=296 bgcolor=#E9E9E9
| 209296 ||  || — || December 22, 2003 || Kitt Peak || Spacewatch || AGN || align=right | 1.7 km || 
|-id=297 bgcolor=#E9E9E9
| 209297 ||  || — || December 23, 2003 || Socorro || LINEAR || — || align=right | 1.3 km || 
|-id=298 bgcolor=#E9E9E9
| 209298 ||  || — || December 23, 2003 || Socorro || LINEAR || — || align=right | 4.1 km || 
|-id=299 bgcolor=#E9E9E9
| 209299 ||  || — || December 27, 2003 || Socorro || LINEAR || HOF || align=right | 3.8 km || 
|-id=300 bgcolor=#E9E9E9
| 209300 ||  || — || December 27, 2003 || Socorro || LINEAR || — || align=right | 3.4 km || 
|}

209301–209400 

|-bgcolor=#E9E9E9
| 209301 ||  || — || December 25, 2003 || Kitt Peak || Spacewatch || — || align=right | 2.1 km || 
|-id=302 bgcolor=#E9E9E9
| 209302 ||  || — || December 28, 2003 || Socorro || LINEAR || — || align=right | 2.4 km || 
|-id=303 bgcolor=#E9E9E9
| 209303 ||  || — || December 28, 2003 || Socorro || LINEAR || — || align=right | 2.4 km || 
|-id=304 bgcolor=#E9E9E9
| 209304 ||  || — || December 28, 2003 || Socorro || LINEAR || — || align=right | 3.1 km || 
|-id=305 bgcolor=#E9E9E9
| 209305 ||  || — || December 28, 2003 || Socorro || LINEAR || — || align=right | 2.8 km || 
|-id=306 bgcolor=#E9E9E9
| 209306 ||  || — || December 16, 2003 || Kitt Peak || Spacewatch || — || align=right | 2.4 km || 
|-id=307 bgcolor=#E9E9E9
| 209307 ||  || — || December 17, 2003 || Kitt Peak || Spacewatch || — || align=right | 2.1 km || 
|-id=308 bgcolor=#E9E9E9
| 209308 ||  || — || December 17, 2003 || Socorro || LINEAR || — || align=right | 2.5 km || 
|-id=309 bgcolor=#E9E9E9
| 209309 ||  || — || December 19, 2003 || Kitt Peak || Spacewatch || — || align=right | 2.2 km || 
|-id=310 bgcolor=#E9E9E9
| 209310 || 2004 AP || — || January 12, 2004 || Palomar || NEAT || — || align=right | 4.0 km || 
|-id=311 bgcolor=#fefefe
| 209311 ||  || — || January 13, 2004 || Anderson Mesa || LONEOS || H || align=right data-sort-value="0.71" | 710 m || 
|-id=312 bgcolor=#E9E9E9
| 209312 ||  || — || January 15, 2004 || Kitt Peak || Spacewatch || — || align=right | 1.8 km || 
|-id=313 bgcolor=#E9E9E9
| 209313 ||  || — || January 12, 2004 || Palomar || NEAT || — || align=right | 1.5 km || 
|-id=314 bgcolor=#E9E9E9
| 209314 ||  || — || January 16, 2004 || Kitt Peak || Spacewatch || — || align=right | 2.7 km || 
|-id=315 bgcolor=#E9E9E9
| 209315 ||  || — || January 16, 2004 || Kitt Peak || Spacewatch || AGN || align=right | 1.6 km || 
|-id=316 bgcolor=#E9E9E9
| 209316 ||  || — || January 17, 2004 || Palomar || NEAT || — || align=right | 1.9 km || 
|-id=317 bgcolor=#E9E9E9
| 209317 ||  || — || January 17, 2004 || Palomar || NEAT || — || align=right | 2.7 km || 
|-id=318 bgcolor=#E9E9E9
| 209318 ||  || — || January 19, 2004 || Kitt Peak || Spacewatch || — || align=right | 2.5 km || 
|-id=319 bgcolor=#E9E9E9
| 209319 ||  || — || January 22, 2004 || Palomar || NEAT || — || align=right | 3.5 km || 
|-id=320 bgcolor=#E9E9E9
| 209320 ||  || — || January 24, 2004 || Socorro || LINEAR || — || align=right | 2.8 km || 
|-id=321 bgcolor=#E9E9E9
| 209321 ||  || — || January 22, 2004 || Socorro || LINEAR || — || align=right | 4.0 km || 
|-id=322 bgcolor=#E9E9E9
| 209322 ||  || — || January 22, 2004 || Socorro || LINEAR || — || align=right | 3.1 km || 
|-id=323 bgcolor=#d6d6d6
| 209323 ||  || — || January 22, 2004 || Socorro || LINEAR || — || align=right | 3.5 km || 
|-id=324 bgcolor=#E9E9E9
| 209324 ||  || — || January 27, 2004 || Anderson Mesa || LONEOS || — || align=right | 3.0 km || 
|-id=325 bgcolor=#E9E9E9
| 209325 ||  || — || January 24, 2004 || Socorro || LINEAR || — || align=right | 3.8 km || 
|-id=326 bgcolor=#E9E9E9
| 209326 ||  || — || January 23, 2004 || Anderson Mesa || LONEOS || — || align=right | 3.9 km || 
|-id=327 bgcolor=#d6d6d6
| 209327 ||  || — || January 26, 2004 || Anderson Mesa || LONEOS || — || align=right | 5.7 km || 
|-id=328 bgcolor=#E9E9E9
| 209328 ||  || — || January 27, 2004 || Anderson Mesa || LONEOS || — || align=right | 3.5 km || 
|-id=329 bgcolor=#E9E9E9
| 209329 ||  || — || January 28, 2004 || Catalina || CSS || — || align=right | 4.7 km || 
|-id=330 bgcolor=#E9E9E9
| 209330 ||  || — || January 16, 2004 || Kitt Peak || Spacewatch || HEN || align=right | 1.4 km || 
|-id=331 bgcolor=#E9E9E9
| 209331 ||  || — || January 16, 2004 || Kitt Peak || Spacewatch || AGN || align=right | 1.4 km || 
|-id=332 bgcolor=#E9E9E9
| 209332 ||  || — || January 16, 2004 || Kitt Peak || Spacewatch || HEN || align=right | 1.1 km || 
|-id=333 bgcolor=#E9E9E9
| 209333 ||  || — || January 19, 2004 || Kitt Peak || Spacewatch || — || align=right | 1.7 km || 
|-id=334 bgcolor=#E9E9E9
| 209334 ||  || — || January 16, 2004 || Catalina || CSS || — || align=right | 2.0 km || 
|-id=335 bgcolor=#E9E9E9
| 209335 ||  || — || January 16, 2004 || Palomar || NEAT || — || align=right | 3.0 km || 
|-id=336 bgcolor=#d6d6d6
| 209336 ||  || — || February 9, 2004 || Palomar || NEAT || — || align=right | 5.1 km || 
|-id=337 bgcolor=#d6d6d6
| 209337 ||  || — || February 11, 2004 || Anderson Mesa || LONEOS || THM || align=right | 3.0 km || 
|-id=338 bgcolor=#E9E9E9
| 209338 ||  || — || February 11, 2004 || Kitt Peak || Spacewatch || — || align=right | 3.0 km || 
|-id=339 bgcolor=#E9E9E9
| 209339 ||  || — || February 11, 2004 || Kitt Peak || Spacewatch || — || align=right | 3.3 km || 
|-id=340 bgcolor=#E9E9E9
| 209340 ||  || — || February 11, 2004 || Anderson Mesa || LONEOS || — || align=right | 3.5 km || 
|-id=341 bgcolor=#d6d6d6
| 209341 ||  || — || February 12, 2004 || Kitt Peak || Spacewatch || — || align=right | 3.3 km || 
|-id=342 bgcolor=#d6d6d6
| 209342 ||  || — || February 14, 2004 || Haleakala || NEAT || TRP || align=right | 3.5 km || 
|-id=343 bgcolor=#fefefe
| 209343 ||  || — || February 11, 2004 || Palomar || NEAT || H || align=right data-sort-value="0.74" | 740 m || 
|-id=344 bgcolor=#E9E9E9
| 209344 ||  || — || February 11, 2004 || Kitt Peak || Spacewatch || — || align=right | 2.6 km || 
|-id=345 bgcolor=#E9E9E9
| 209345 ||  || — || February 11, 2004 || Kitt Peak || Spacewatch || NEM || align=right | 3.1 km || 
|-id=346 bgcolor=#d6d6d6
| 209346 ||  || — || February 11, 2004 || Palomar || NEAT || EOS || align=right | 2.6 km || 
|-id=347 bgcolor=#d6d6d6
| 209347 ||  || — || February 13, 2004 || Kitt Peak || Spacewatch || BRA || align=right | 2.0 km || 
|-id=348 bgcolor=#E9E9E9
| 209348 ||  || — || February 14, 2004 || Kitt Peak || Spacewatch || HOF || align=right | 3.7 km || 
|-id=349 bgcolor=#E9E9E9
| 209349 ||  || — || February 10, 2004 || Palomar || NEAT || AGN || align=right | 1.7 km || 
|-id=350 bgcolor=#E9E9E9
| 209350 ||  || — || February 11, 2004 || Kitt Peak || Spacewatch || HEN || align=right | 1.6 km || 
|-id=351 bgcolor=#E9E9E9
| 209351 ||  || — || February 16, 2004 || Kitt Peak || Spacewatch || AGN || align=right | 1.7 km || 
|-id=352 bgcolor=#d6d6d6
| 209352 ||  || — || February 16, 2004 || Kitt Peak || Spacewatch || — || align=right | 3.9 km || 
|-id=353 bgcolor=#E9E9E9
| 209353 ||  || — || February 18, 2004 || Haleakala || NEAT || — || align=right | 3.5 km || 
|-id=354 bgcolor=#d6d6d6
| 209354 ||  || — || February 20, 2004 || Altschwendt || W. Ries || EOS || align=right | 2.4 km || 
|-id=355 bgcolor=#d6d6d6
| 209355 ||  || — || February 22, 2004 || Kitt Peak || Spacewatch || — || align=right | 3.4 km || 
|-id=356 bgcolor=#d6d6d6
| 209356 ||  || — || February 18, 2004 || Socorro || LINEAR || EOS || align=right | 3.1 km || 
|-id=357 bgcolor=#d6d6d6
| 209357 ||  || — || February 19, 2004 || Socorro || LINEAR || — || align=right | 8.0 km || 
|-id=358 bgcolor=#d6d6d6
| 209358 ||  || — || February 17, 2004 || Kitt Peak || Spacewatch || — || align=right | 3.3 km || 
|-id=359 bgcolor=#d6d6d6
| 209359 ||  || — || February 19, 2004 || Socorro || LINEAR || — || align=right | 4.1 km || 
|-id=360 bgcolor=#d6d6d6
| 209360 ||  || — || February 19, 2004 || Bergisch Gladbach || W. Bickel || CHA || align=right | 2.6 km || 
|-id=361 bgcolor=#d6d6d6
| 209361 ||  || — || February 22, 2004 || Kitt Peak || Spacewatch || K-2 || align=right | 1.7 km || 
|-id=362 bgcolor=#d6d6d6
| 209362 ||  || — || February 23, 2004 || Socorro || LINEAR || — || align=right | 4.1 km || 
|-id=363 bgcolor=#d6d6d6
| 209363 ||  || — || February 26, 2004 || Socorro || LINEAR || — || align=right | 3.5 km || 
|-id=364 bgcolor=#d6d6d6
| 209364 ||  || — || February 29, 2004 || Kitt Peak || Spacewatch || — || align=right | 3.8 km || 
|-id=365 bgcolor=#d6d6d6
| 209365 ||  || — || February 18, 2004 || Socorro || LINEAR || — || align=right | 2.9 km || 
|-id=366 bgcolor=#fefefe
| 209366 ||  || — || March 10, 2004 || Palomar || NEAT || H || align=right data-sort-value="0.85" | 850 m || 
|-id=367 bgcolor=#d6d6d6
| 209367 ||  || — || March 13, 2004 || Palomar || NEAT || — || align=right | 4.2 km || 
|-id=368 bgcolor=#d6d6d6
| 209368 ||  || — || March 10, 2004 || Palomar || NEAT || — || align=right | 3.7 km || 
|-id=369 bgcolor=#d6d6d6
| 209369 ||  || — || March 11, 2004 || Palomar || NEAT || EOS || align=right | 3.9 km || 
|-id=370 bgcolor=#d6d6d6
| 209370 ||  || — || March 11, 2004 || Palomar || NEAT || — || align=right | 4.0 km || 
|-id=371 bgcolor=#d6d6d6
| 209371 ||  || — || March 11, 2004 || Palomar || NEAT || — || align=right | 5.3 km || 
|-id=372 bgcolor=#d6d6d6
| 209372 ||  || — || March 12, 2004 || Palomar || NEAT || EOS || align=right | 2.8 km || 
|-id=373 bgcolor=#d6d6d6
| 209373 ||  || — || March 12, 2004 || Palomar || NEAT || EOS || align=right | 2.6 km || 
|-id=374 bgcolor=#d6d6d6
| 209374 Sabil ||  ||  || March 15, 2004 || Ottmarsheim || Ottmarsheim Obs. || KOR || align=right | 2.2 km || 
|-id=375 bgcolor=#d6d6d6
| 209375 ||  || — || March 15, 2004 || Catalina || CSS || — || align=right | 4.4 km || 
|-id=376 bgcolor=#d6d6d6
| 209376 ||  || — || March 15, 2004 || Desert Eagle || W. K. Y. Yeung || ALA || align=right | 5.2 km || 
|-id=377 bgcolor=#d6d6d6
| 209377 ||  || — || March 15, 2004 || Kitt Peak || Spacewatch || THM || align=right | 2.5 km || 
|-id=378 bgcolor=#d6d6d6
| 209378 ||  || — || March 15, 2004 || Kitt Peak || Spacewatch || THM || align=right | 4.1 km || 
|-id=379 bgcolor=#d6d6d6
| 209379 ||  || — || March 14, 2004 || Palomar || NEAT || EOS || align=right | 3.5 km || 
|-id=380 bgcolor=#d6d6d6
| 209380 ||  || — || March 15, 2004 || Palomar || NEAT || IMH || align=right | 5.0 km || 
|-id=381 bgcolor=#d6d6d6
| 209381 ||  || — || March 15, 2004 || Kitt Peak || Spacewatch || — || align=right | 3.7 km || 
|-id=382 bgcolor=#d6d6d6
| 209382 ||  || — || March 15, 2004 || Catalina || CSS || — || align=right | 5.5 km || 
|-id=383 bgcolor=#d6d6d6
| 209383 ||  || — || March 11, 2004 || Palomar || NEAT || 628 || align=right | 3.2 km || 
|-id=384 bgcolor=#d6d6d6
| 209384 ||  || — || March 15, 2004 || Kitt Peak || Spacewatch || — || align=right | 5.1 km || 
|-id=385 bgcolor=#d6d6d6
| 209385 ||  || — || March 15, 2004 || Kitt Peak || Spacewatch || EOS || align=right | 2.5 km || 
|-id=386 bgcolor=#d6d6d6
| 209386 ||  || — || March 15, 2004 || Catalina || CSS || — || align=right | 3.9 km || 
|-id=387 bgcolor=#d6d6d6
| 209387 ||  || — || March 15, 2004 || Catalina || CSS || — || align=right | 2.9 km || 
|-id=388 bgcolor=#d6d6d6
| 209388 ||  || — || March 15, 2004 || Catalina || CSS || EOS || align=right | 2.6 km || 
|-id=389 bgcolor=#d6d6d6
| 209389 ||  || — || March 15, 2004 || Socorro || LINEAR || — || align=right | 5.4 km || 
|-id=390 bgcolor=#d6d6d6
| 209390 ||  || — || March 14, 2004 || Palomar || NEAT || EUP || align=right | 6.2 km || 
|-id=391 bgcolor=#d6d6d6
| 209391 ||  || — || March 11, 2004 || Palomar || NEAT || THM || align=right | 2.9 km || 
|-id=392 bgcolor=#d6d6d6
| 209392 ||  || — || March 12, 2004 || Palomar || NEAT || — || align=right | 3.9 km || 
|-id=393 bgcolor=#d6d6d6
| 209393 ||  || — || March 13, 2004 || Palomar || NEAT || — || align=right | 3.8 km || 
|-id=394 bgcolor=#d6d6d6
| 209394 ||  || — || March 13, 2004 || Palomar || NEAT || — || align=right | 2.8 km || 
|-id=395 bgcolor=#d6d6d6
| 209395 ||  || — || March 15, 2004 || Kitt Peak || Spacewatch || — || align=right | 3.4 km || 
|-id=396 bgcolor=#d6d6d6
| 209396 ||  || — || March 15, 2004 || Kitt Peak || Spacewatch || — || align=right | 5.3 km || 
|-id=397 bgcolor=#d6d6d6
| 209397 ||  || — || March 14, 2004 || Kitt Peak || Spacewatch || — || align=right | 5.1 km || 
|-id=398 bgcolor=#d6d6d6
| 209398 ||  || — || March 15, 2004 || Catalina || CSS || — || align=right | 3.6 km || 
|-id=399 bgcolor=#d6d6d6
| 209399 ||  || — || March 15, 2004 || Kitt Peak || Spacewatch || — || align=right | 3.5 km || 
|-id=400 bgcolor=#d6d6d6
| 209400 ||  || — || March 13, 2004 || Palomar || NEAT || — || align=right | 3.2 km || 
|}

209401–209500 

|-bgcolor=#d6d6d6
| 209401 ||  || — || March 13, 2004 || Palomar || NEAT || — || align=right | 4.4 km || 
|-id=402 bgcolor=#d6d6d6
| 209402 ||  || — || March 15, 2004 || Socorro || LINEAR || — || align=right | 5.5 km || 
|-id=403 bgcolor=#d6d6d6
| 209403 ||  || — || March 15, 2004 || Kitt Peak || Spacewatch || — || align=right | 3.1 km || 
|-id=404 bgcolor=#d6d6d6
| 209404 ||  || — || March 15, 2004 || Socorro || LINEAR || — || align=right | 4.1 km || 
|-id=405 bgcolor=#d6d6d6
| 209405 ||  || — || March 15, 2004 || Socorro || LINEAR || — || align=right | 5.4 km || 
|-id=406 bgcolor=#d6d6d6
| 209406 ||  || — || March 15, 2004 || Socorro || LINEAR || — || align=right | 5.7 km || 
|-id=407 bgcolor=#d6d6d6
| 209407 ||  || — || March 17, 2004 || Bergisch Gladbach || W. Bickel || — || align=right | 3.0 km || 
|-id=408 bgcolor=#d6d6d6
| 209408 ||  || — || March 20, 2004 || Needville || Needville Obs. || — || align=right | 2.6 km || 
|-id=409 bgcolor=#E9E9E9
| 209409 ||  || — || March 16, 2004 || Socorro || LINEAR || — || align=right | 3.6 km || 
|-id=410 bgcolor=#d6d6d6
| 209410 ||  || — || March 16, 2004 || Catalina || CSS || VER || align=right | 4.3 km || 
|-id=411 bgcolor=#d6d6d6
| 209411 ||  || — || March 16, 2004 || Catalina || CSS || TIR || align=right | 4.4 km || 
|-id=412 bgcolor=#d6d6d6
| 209412 ||  || — || March 16, 2004 || Siding Spring || SSS || — || align=right | 3.8 km || 
|-id=413 bgcolor=#d6d6d6
| 209413 ||  || — || March 17, 2004 || Kitt Peak || Spacewatch || — || align=right | 3.1 km || 
|-id=414 bgcolor=#d6d6d6
| 209414 ||  || — || March 29, 2004 || Socorro || LINEAR || Tj (2.99) || align=right | 4.7 km || 
|-id=415 bgcolor=#d6d6d6
| 209415 ||  || — || March 29, 2004 || Socorro || LINEAR || EUP || align=right | 4.1 km || 
|-id=416 bgcolor=#d6d6d6
| 209416 ||  || — || March 18, 2004 || Palomar || NEAT || EUP || align=right | 5.1 km || 
|-id=417 bgcolor=#d6d6d6
| 209417 ||  || — || March 30, 2004 || Socorro || LINEAR || — || align=right | 4.9 km || 
|-id=418 bgcolor=#d6d6d6
| 209418 ||  || — || March 16, 2004 || Kitt Peak || Spacewatch || — || align=right | 6.4 km || 
|-id=419 bgcolor=#d6d6d6
| 209419 ||  || — || March 16, 2004 || Socorro || LINEAR || — || align=right | 4.2 km || 
|-id=420 bgcolor=#d6d6d6
| 209420 ||  || — || March 17, 2004 || Socorro || LINEAR || — || align=right | 4.5 km || 
|-id=421 bgcolor=#d6d6d6
| 209421 ||  || — || March 17, 2004 || Socorro || LINEAR || — || align=right | 4.6 km || 
|-id=422 bgcolor=#d6d6d6
| 209422 ||  || — || March 17, 2004 || Socorro || LINEAR || — || align=right | 4.9 km || 
|-id=423 bgcolor=#d6d6d6
| 209423 ||  || — || March 18, 2004 || Socorro || LINEAR || — || align=right | 4.1 km || 
|-id=424 bgcolor=#d6d6d6
| 209424 ||  || — || March 16, 2004 || Catalina || CSS || EUP || align=right | 4.3 km || 
|-id=425 bgcolor=#d6d6d6
| 209425 ||  || — || March 16, 2004 || Kitt Peak || Spacewatch || LIX || align=right | 6.8 km || 
|-id=426 bgcolor=#d6d6d6
| 209426 ||  || — || March 18, 2004 || Socorro || LINEAR || EMA || align=right | 4.8 km || 
|-id=427 bgcolor=#d6d6d6
| 209427 ||  || — || March 18, 2004 || Socorro || LINEAR || HYG || align=right | 5.2 km || 
|-id=428 bgcolor=#d6d6d6
| 209428 ||  || — || March 18, 2004 || Kitt Peak || Spacewatch || — || align=right | 3.3 km || 
|-id=429 bgcolor=#d6d6d6
| 209429 ||  || — || March 19, 2004 || Socorro || LINEAR || — || align=right | 4.0 km || 
|-id=430 bgcolor=#d6d6d6
| 209430 ||  || — || March 16, 2004 || Kitt Peak || Spacewatch || — || align=right | 4.2 km || 
|-id=431 bgcolor=#d6d6d6
| 209431 ||  || — || March 18, 2004 || Socorro || LINEAR || — || align=right | 4.1 km || 
|-id=432 bgcolor=#d6d6d6
| 209432 ||  || — || March 19, 2004 || Kitt Peak || Spacewatch || — || align=right | 3.5 km || 
|-id=433 bgcolor=#d6d6d6
| 209433 ||  || — || March 19, 2004 || Socorro || LINEAR || — || align=right | 5.1 km || 
|-id=434 bgcolor=#d6d6d6
| 209434 ||  || — || March 19, 2004 || Socorro || LINEAR || — || align=right | 4.7 km || 
|-id=435 bgcolor=#d6d6d6
| 209435 ||  || — || March 19, 2004 || Socorro || LINEAR || EOS || align=right | 2.8 km || 
|-id=436 bgcolor=#d6d6d6
| 209436 ||  || — || March 16, 2004 || Kitt Peak || Spacewatch || EOS || align=right | 2.8 km || 
|-id=437 bgcolor=#d6d6d6
| 209437 ||  || — || March 16, 2004 || Kitt Peak || Spacewatch || ANF || align=right | 2.3 km || 
|-id=438 bgcolor=#d6d6d6
| 209438 ||  || — || March 16, 2004 || Socorro || LINEAR || — || align=right | 5.6 km || 
|-id=439 bgcolor=#d6d6d6
| 209439 ||  || — || March 20, 2004 || Socorro || LINEAR || — || align=right | 3.4 km || 
|-id=440 bgcolor=#d6d6d6
| 209440 ||  || — || March 23, 2004 || Socorro || LINEAR || VER || align=right | 4.0 km || 
|-id=441 bgcolor=#d6d6d6
| 209441 ||  || — || March 23, 2004 || Kitt Peak || Spacewatch || — || align=right | 4.1 km || 
|-id=442 bgcolor=#d6d6d6
| 209442 ||  || — || March 23, 2004 || Socorro || LINEAR || — || align=right | 3.6 km || 
|-id=443 bgcolor=#d6d6d6
| 209443 ||  || — || March 20, 2004 || Socorro || LINEAR || — || align=right | 5.2 km || 
|-id=444 bgcolor=#d6d6d6
| 209444 ||  || — || March 23, 2004 || Socorro || LINEAR || — || align=right | 4.9 km || 
|-id=445 bgcolor=#d6d6d6
| 209445 ||  || — || March 26, 2004 || Kitt Peak || Spacewatch || — || align=right | 3.3 km || 
|-id=446 bgcolor=#d6d6d6
| 209446 ||  || — || March 22, 2004 || Anderson Mesa || LONEOS || — || align=right | 5.8 km || 
|-id=447 bgcolor=#d6d6d6
| 209447 ||  || — || March 27, 2004 || Anderson Mesa || LONEOS || LIX || align=right | 4.6 km || 
|-id=448 bgcolor=#d6d6d6
| 209448 ||  || — || March 29, 2004 || Socorro || LINEAR || — || align=right | 6.9 km || 
|-id=449 bgcolor=#d6d6d6
| 209449 ||  || — || March 29, 2004 || Socorro || LINEAR || TIR || align=right | 4.7 km || 
|-id=450 bgcolor=#d6d6d6
| 209450 ||  || — || March 20, 2004 || Anderson Mesa || LONEOS || — || align=right | 5.1 km || 
|-id=451 bgcolor=#d6d6d6
| 209451 ||  || — || March 27, 2004 || Socorro || LINEAR || — || align=right | 4.5 km || 
|-id=452 bgcolor=#d6d6d6
| 209452 ||  || — || March 18, 2004 || Kitt Peak || Spacewatch || KOR || align=right | 1.8 km || 
|-id=453 bgcolor=#d6d6d6
| 209453 ||  || — || April 11, 2004 || Palomar || NEAT || TIR || align=right | 2.9 km || 
|-id=454 bgcolor=#fefefe
| 209454 ||  || — || April 12, 2004 || Socorro || LINEAR || H || align=right data-sort-value="0.94" | 940 m || 
|-id=455 bgcolor=#fefefe
| 209455 ||  || — || April 14, 2004 || Socorro || LINEAR || H || align=right | 1.2 km || 
|-id=456 bgcolor=#d6d6d6
| 209456 ||  || — || April 10, 2004 || Palomar || NEAT || — || align=right | 4.4 km || 
|-id=457 bgcolor=#d6d6d6
| 209457 ||  || — || April 12, 2004 || Catalina || CSS || — || align=right | 4.9 km || 
|-id=458 bgcolor=#d6d6d6
| 209458 ||  || — || April 12, 2004 || Anderson Mesa || LONEOS || — || align=right | 4.4 km || 
|-id=459 bgcolor=#fefefe
| 209459 ||  || — || April 14, 2004 || Socorro || LINEAR || H || align=right | 1.5 km || 
|-id=460 bgcolor=#d6d6d6
| 209460 ||  || — || April 15, 2004 || Socorro || LINEAR || EUP || align=right | 4.5 km || 
|-id=461 bgcolor=#d6d6d6
| 209461 ||  || — || April 12, 2004 || Kitt Peak || Spacewatch || LIX || align=right | 5.4 km || 
|-id=462 bgcolor=#d6d6d6
| 209462 ||  || — || April 12, 2004 || Kitt Peak || Spacewatch || THM || align=right | 4.0 km || 
|-id=463 bgcolor=#d6d6d6
| 209463 ||  || — || April 12, 2004 || Kitt Peak || Spacewatch || — || align=right | 2.9 km || 
|-id=464 bgcolor=#d6d6d6
| 209464 ||  || — || April 12, 2004 || Kitt Peak || Spacewatch || ALA || align=right | 4.8 km || 
|-id=465 bgcolor=#d6d6d6
| 209465 ||  || — || April 12, 2004 || Kitt Peak || Spacewatch || — || align=right | 2.9 km || 
|-id=466 bgcolor=#d6d6d6
| 209466 ||  || — || April 13, 2004 || Kitt Peak || Spacewatch || — || align=right | 3.5 km || 
|-id=467 bgcolor=#d6d6d6
| 209467 ||  || — || April 13, 2004 || Kitt Peak || Spacewatch || — || align=right | 3.4 km || 
|-id=468 bgcolor=#d6d6d6
| 209468 ||  || — || April 13, 2004 || Kitt Peak || Spacewatch || HYG || align=right | 3.2 km || 
|-id=469 bgcolor=#d6d6d6
| 209469 ||  || — || April 13, 2004 || Kitt Peak || Spacewatch || — || align=right | 4.4 km || 
|-id=470 bgcolor=#d6d6d6
| 209470 ||  || — || April 14, 2004 || Kitt Peak || Spacewatch || — || align=right | 2.8 km || 
|-id=471 bgcolor=#d6d6d6
| 209471 ||  || — || April 14, 2004 || Kitt Peak || Spacewatch || — || align=right | 4.0 km || 
|-id=472 bgcolor=#d6d6d6
| 209472 ||  || — || April 13, 2004 || Kitt Peak || Spacewatch || HYG || align=right | 3.5 km || 
|-id=473 bgcolor=#d6d6d6
| 209473 ||  || — || April 13, 2004 || Kitt Peak || Spacewatch || HYG || align=right | 3.6 km || 
|-id=474 bgcolor=#fefefe
| 209474 ||  || — || April 19, 2004 || Socorro || LINEAR || H || align=right | 1.2 km || 
|-id=475 bgcolor=#d6d6d6
| 209475 ||  || — || April 16, 2004 || Palomar || NEAT || — || align=right | 4.3 km || 
|-id=476 bgcolor=#d6d6d6
| 209476 ||  || — || April 16, 2004 || Socorro || LINEAR || — || align=right | 4.7 km || 
|-id=477 bgcolor=#d6d6d6
| 209477 ||  || — || April 16, 2004 || Socorro || LINEAR || — || align=right | 4.1 km || 
|-id=478 bgcolor=#d6d6d6
| 209478 ||  || — || April 17, 2004 || Socorro || LINEAR || — || align=right | 4.8 km || 
|-id=479 bgcolor=#d6d6d6
| 209479 ||  || — || April 19, 2004 || Anderson Mesa || LONEOS || — || align=right | 6.6 km || 
|-id=480 bgcolor=#d6d6d6
| 209480 ||  || — || April 21, 2004 || Socorro || LINEAR || HYG || align=right | 4.0 km || 
|-id=481 bgcolor=#fefefe
| 209481 ||  || — || April 23, 2004 || Socorro || LINEAR || H || align=right data-sort-value="0.73" | 730 m || 
|-id=482 bgcolor=#d6d6d6
| 209482 ||  || — || April 17, 2004 || Socorro || LINEAR || — || align=right | 3.8 km || 
|-id=483 bgcolor=#d6d6d6
| 209483 ||  || — || April 22, 2004 || Catalina || CSS || — || align=right | 5.1 km || 
|-id=484 bgcolor=#d6d6d6
| 209484 ||  || — || April 21, 2004 || Socorro || LINEAR || — || align=right | 4.6 km || 
|-id=485 bgcolor=#d6d6d6
| 209485 ||  || — || April 24, 2004 || Socorro || LINEAR || — || align=right | 5.2 km || 
|-id=486 bgcolor=#d6d6d6
| 209486 ||  || — || April 23, 2004 || Catalina || CSS || — || align=right | 4.3 km || 
|-id=487 bgcolor=#d6d6d6
| 209487 ||  || — || April 17, 2004 || Socorro || LINEAR || TIR || align=right | 5.0 km || 
|-id=488 bgcolor=#d6d6d6
| 209488 ||  || — || April 30, 2004 || Haleakala || NEAT || — || align=right | 4.6 km || 
|-id=489 bgcolor=#d6d6d6
| 209489 || 2004 JV || — || May 10, 2004 || Desert Eagle || W. K. Y. Yeung || THM || align=right | 4.3 km || 
|-id=490 bgcolor=#d6d6d6
| 209490 ||  || — || May 9, 2004 || Kitt Peak || Spacewatch || 7:4 || align=right | 3.9 km || 
|-id=491 bgcolor=#d6d6d6
| 209491 ||  || — || May 10, 2004 || Catalina || CSS || TIR || align=right | 3.8 km || 
|-id=492 bgcolor=#fefefe
| 209492 ||  || — || May 12, 2004 || Socorro || LINEAR || H || align=right | 1.2 km || 
|-id=493 bgcolor=#fefefe
| 209493 ||  || — || May 9, 2004 || Haleakala || NEAT || H || align=right data-sort-value="0.83" | 830 m || 
|-id=494 bgcolor=#d6d6d6
| 209494 ||  || — || May 12, 2004 || Catalina || CSS || LIX || align=right | 5.0 km || 
|-id=495 bgcolor=#d6d6d6
| 209495 ||  || — || May 12, 2004 || Catalina || CSS || TIR || align=right | 4.3 km || 
|-id=496 bgcolor=#d6d6d6
| 209496 ||  || — || May 12, 2004 || Catalina || CSS || — || align=right | 6.2 km || 
|-id=497 bgcolor=#d6d6d6
| 209497 ||  || — || May 9, 2004 || Kitt Peak || Spacewatch || — || align=right | 6.1 km || 
|-id=498 bgcolor=#d6d6d6
| 209498 ||  || — || May 12, 2004 || Siding Spring || SSS || THM || align=right | 3.3 km || 
|-id=499 bgcolor=#d6d6d6
| 209499 ||  || — || May 9, 2004 || Kitt Peak || Spacewatch || — || align=right | 4.0 km || 
|-id=500 bgcolor=#d6d6d6
| 209500 ||  || — || May 9, 2004 || Kitt Peak || Spacewatch || — || align=right | 3.6 km || 
|}

209501–209600 

|-bgcolor=#d6d6d6
| 209501 ||  || — || May 12, 2004 || Anderson Mesa || LONEOS || — || align=right | 5.6 km || 
|-id=502 bgcolor=#d6d6d6
| 209502 ||  || — || May 23, 2004 || Kitt Peak || Spacewatch || — || align=right | 3.5 km || 
|-id=503 bgcolor=#fefefe
| 209503 ||  || — || May 23, 2004 || Catalina || CSS || H || align=right | 1.2 km || 
|-id=504 bgcolor=#fefefe
| 209504 ||  || — || June 11, 2004 || Palomar || NEAT || H || align=right data-sort-value="0.94" | 940 m || 
|-id=505 bgcolor=#fefefe
| 209505 ||  || — || June 11, 2004 || Palomar || NEAT || — || align=right | 1.1 km || 
|-id=506 bgcolor=#fefefe
| 209506 ||  || — || July 15, 2004 || Socorro || LINEAR || — || align=right | 1.6 km || 
|-id=507 bgcolor=#d6d6d6
| 209507 ||  || — || August 7, 2004 || Campo Imperatore || CINEOS || HIL3:2 || align=right | 9.6 km || 
|-id=508 bgcolor=#fefefe
| 209508 ||  || — || August 8, 2004 || Socorro || LINEAR || FLO || align=right data-sort-value="0.80" | 800 m || 
|-id=509 bgcolor=#fefefe
| 209509 ||  || — || August 8, 2004 || Palomar || NEAT || V || align=right data-sort-value="0.85" | 850 m || 
|-id=510 bgcolor=#fefefe
| 209510 ||  || — || August 10, 2004 || Socorro || LINEAR || — || align=right | 1.2 km || 
|-id=511 bgcolor=#fefefe
| 209511 ||  || — || August 10, 2004 || Socorro || LINEAR || NYS || align=right | 1.1 km || 
|-id=512 bgcolor=#d6d6d6
| 209512 ||  || — || September 5, 2004 || Bergisch Gladbach || W. Bickel || HIL3:2 || align=right | 7.4 km || 
|-id=513 bgcolor=#fefefe
| 209513 ||  || — || September 7, 2004 || Socorro || LINEAR || H || align=right data-sort-value="0.97" | 970 m || 
|-id=514 bgcolor=#fefefe
| 209514 ||  || — || September 8, 2004 || Socorro || LINEAR || V || align=right data-sort-value="0.79" | 790 m || 
|-id=515 bgcolor=#fefefe
| 209515 ||  || — || September 10, 2004 || Socorro || LINEAR || — || align=right | 1.1 km || 
|-id=516 bgcolor=#fefefe
| 209516 ||  || — || September 15, 2004 || 7300 Observatory || W. K. Y. Yeung || — || align=right | 1.5 km || 
|-id=517 bgcolor=#fefefe
| 209517 ||  || — || September 13, 2004 || Socorro || LINEAR || FLO || align=right data-sort-value="0.82" | 820 m || 
|-id=518 bgcolor=#fefefe
| 209518 ||  || — || September 13, 2004 || Socorro || LINEAR || V || align=right data-sort-value="0.91" | 910 m || 
|-id=519 bgcolor=#fefefe
| 209519 ||  || — || September 13, 2004 || Socorro || LINEAR || PHO || align=right | 1.6 km || 
|-id=520 bgcolor=#fefefe
| 209520 ||  || — || September 15, 2004 || Kitt Peak || Spacewatch || — || align=right | 1.0 km || 
|-id=521 bgcolor=#fefefe
| 209521 ||  || — || September 17, 2004 || Socorro || LINEAR || — || align=right | 1.1 km || 
|-id=522 bgcolor=#fefefe
| 209522 ||  || — || September 17, 2004 || Socorro || LINEAR || FLO || align=right | 1.0 km || 
|-id=523 bgcolor=#fefefe
| 209523 ||  || — || September 22, 2004 || Socorro || LINEAR || — || align=right data-sort-value="0.80" | 800 m || 
|-id=524 bgcolor=#fefefe
| 209524 ||  || — || September 17, 2004 || Kitt Peak || Spacewatch || — || align=right data-sort-value="0.86" | 860 m || 
|-id=525 bgcolor=#fefefe
| 209525 ||  || — || October 5, 2004 || Goodricke-Pigott || R. A. Tucker || NYS || align=right data-sort-value="0.79" | 790 m || 
|-id=526 bgcolor=#fefefe
| 209526 ||  || — || October 4, 2004 || Kitt Peak || Spacewatch || — || align=right data-sort-value="0.94" | 940 m || 
|-id=527 bgcolor=#fefefe
| 209527 ||  || — || October 5, 2004 || Anderson Mesa || LONEOS || — || align=right data-sort-value="0.99" | 990 m || 
|-id=528 bgcolor=#fefefe
| 209528 ||  || — || October 5, 2004 || Anderson Mesa || LONEOS || — || align=right | 1.3 km || 
|-id=529 bgcolor=#fefefe
| 209529 ||  || — || October 5, 2004 || Kitt Peak || Spacewatch || NYS || align=right | 1.7 km || 
|-id=530 bgcolor=#fefefe
| 209530 ||  || — || October 7, 2004 || Kitt Peak || Spacewatch || — || align=right data-sort-value="0.81" | 810 m || 
|-id=531 bgcolor=#E9E9E9
| 209531 ||  || — || October 5, 2004 || Kitt Peak || Spacewatch || WIT || align=right | 1.7 km || 
|-id=532 bgcolor=#fefefe
| 209532 ||  || — || October 9, 2004 || Kitt Peak || Spacewatch || — || align=right data-sort-value="0.66" | 660 m || 
|-id=533 bgcolor=#fefefe
| 209533 ||  || — || October 9, 2004 || Socorro || LINEAR || — || align=right | 1.5 km || 
|-id=534 bgcolor=#fefefe
| 209534 ||  || — || October 11, 2004 || Kitt Peak || Spacewatch || ERI || align=right | 2.6 km || 
|-id=535 bgcolor=#fefefe
| 209535 ||  || — || October 9, 2004 || Kitt Peak || Spacewatch || — || align=right | 1.1 km || 
|-id=536 bgcolor=#fefefe
| 209536 ||  || — || October 10, 2004 || Kitt Peak || Spacewatch || — || align=right data-sort-value="0.71" | 710 m || 
|-id=537 bgcolor=#fefefe
| 209537 ||  || — || October 4, 2004 || Kitt Peak || Spacewatch || — || align=right data-sort-value="0.83" | 830 m || 
|-id=538 bgcolor=#fefefe
| 209538 ||  || — || October 13, 2004 || Kitt Peak || Spacewatch || — || align=right data-sort-value="0.85" | 850 m || 
|-id=539 bgcolor=#fefefe
| 209539 ||  || — || October 7, 2004 || Kitt Peak || Spacewatch || FLO || align=right data-sort-value="0.91" | 910 m || 
|-id=540 bgcolor=#fefefe
| 209540 Siurana ||  ||  || October 23, 2004 || Begues || J. Manteca || FLO || align=right data-sort-value="0.83" | 830 m || 
|-id=541 bgcolor=#fefefe
| 209541 ||  || — || October 18, 2004 || Socorro || LINEAR || — || align=right | 1.2 km || 
|-id=542 bgcolor=#fefefe
| 209542 ||  || — || October 19, 2004 || Socorro || LINEAR || PHO || align=right | 2.0 km || 
|-id=543 bgcolor=#fefefe
| 209543 ||  || — || October 20, 2004 || Socorro || LINEAR || — || align=right | 1.0 km || 
|-id=544 bgcolor=#fefefe
| 209544 ||  || — || November 3, 2004 || Anderson Mesa || LONEOS || — || align=right data-sort-value="0.91" | 910 m || 
|-id=545 bgcolor=#fefefe
| 209545 ||  || — || November 3, 2004 || Palomar || NEAT || — || align=right data-sort-value="0.82" | 820 m || 
|-id=546 bgcolor=#fefefe
| 209546 ||  || — || November 4, 2004 || Kitt Peak || Spacewatch || NYS || align=right data-sort-value="0.86" | 860 m || 
|-id=547 bgcolor=#fefefe
| 209547 ||  || — || November 4, 2004 || Kitt Peak || Spacewatch || FLO || align=right data-sort-value="0.71" | 710 m || 
|-id=548 bgcolor=#fefefe
| 209548 ||  || — || November 4, 2004 || Kitt Peak || Spacewatch || — || align=right | 1.6 km || 
|-id=549 bgcolor=#fefefe
| 209549 ||  || — || November 7, 2004 || Socorro || LINEAR || ERI || align=right | 2.3 km || 
|-id=550 bgcolor=#fefefe
| 209550 ||  || — || November 4, 2004 || Kitt Peak || Spacewatch || FLO || align=right data-sort-value="0.75" | 750 m || 
|-id=551 bgcolor=#fefefe
| 209551 ||  || — || November 7, 2004 || Socorro || LINEAR || — || align=right | 1.3 km || 
|-id=552 bgcolor=#fefefe
| 209552 Isaacroberts ||  ||  || November 9, 2004 || Haleakala-Faulkes || Faulkes Project || V || align=right data-sort-value="0.53" | 530 m || 
|-id=553 bgcolor=#fefefe
| 209553 ||  || — || November 14, 2004 || Ottmarsheim || Ottmarsheim Obs. || FLO || align=right data-sort-value="0.86" | 860 m || 
|-id=554 bgcolor=#fefefe
| 209554 ||  || — || November 12, 2004 || Catalina || CSS || FLO || align=right data-sort-value="0.94" | 940 m || 
|-id=555 bgcolor=#fefefe
| 209555 ||  || — || November 11, 2004 || Kitt Peak || Spacewatch || — || align=right data-sort-value="0.98" | 980 m || 
|-id=556 bgcolor=#fefefe
| 209556 ||  || — || November 17, 2004 || Campo Imperatore || CINEOS || — || align=right data-sort-value="0.97" | 970 m || 
|-id=557 bgcolor=#fefefe
| 209557 ||  || — || November 19, 2004 || Socorro || LINEAR || ERI || align=right | 2.2 km || 
|-id=558 bgcolor=#fefefe
| 209558 ||  || — || December 1, 2004 || Palomar || NEAT || — || align=right | 1.8 km || 
|-id=559 bgcolor=#fefefe
| 209559 ||  || — || December 3, 2004 || Cordell-Lorenz || Cordell–Lorenz Obs. || — || align=right | 1.1 km || 
|-id=560 bgcolor=#fefefe
| 209560 ||  || — || December 2, 2004 || Socorro || LINEAR || NYS || align=right data-sort-value="0.97" | 970 m || 
|-id=561 bgcolor=#fefefe
| 209561 ||  || — || December 8, 2004 || Socorro || LINEAR || NYS || align=right data-sort-value="0.97" | 970 m || 
|-id=562 bgcolor=#fefefe
| 209562 ||  || — || December 8, 2004 || Socorro || LINEAR || — || align=right data-sort-value="0.92" | 920 m || 
|-id=563 bgcolor=#fefefe
| 209563 ||  || — || December 8, 2004 || Socorro || LINEAR || FLO || align=right | 1.1 km || 
|-id=564 bgcolor=#fefefe
| 209564 ||  || — || December 8, 2004 || Socorro || LINEAR || — || align=right | 1.3 km || 
|-id=565 bgcolor=#E9E9E9
| 209565 ||  || — || December 8, 2004 || Socorro || LINEAR || — || align=right | 1.8 km || 
|-id=566 bgcolor=#fefefe
| 209566 ||  || — || December 8, 2004 || Socorro || LINEAR || FLO || align=right data-sort-value="0.99" | 990 m || 
|-id=567 bgcolor=#fefefe
| 209567 ||  || — || December 8, 2004 || Socorro || LINEAR || NYS || align=right data-sort-value="0.88" | 880 m || 
|-id=568 bgcolor=#fefefe
| 209568 ||  || — || December 10, 2004 || Kitt Peak || Spacewatch || NYS || align=right data-sort-value="0.96" | 960 m || 
|-id=569 bgcolor=#fefefe
| 209569 ||  || — || December 10, 2004 || Socorro || LINEAR || — || align=right | 1.0 km || 
|-id=570 bgcolor=#fefefe
| 209570 ||  || — || December 10, 2004 || Socorro || LINEAR || LCA || align=right | 1.1 km || 
|-id=571 bgcolor=#fefefe
| 209571 ||  || — || December 10, 2004 || Hormersdorf || Hormersdorf Obs. || — || align=right | 1.2 km || 
|-id=572 bgcolor=#fefefe
| 209572 ||  || — || December 10, 2004 || Kitt Peak || Spacewatch || MAS || align=right data-sort-value="0.96" | 960 m || 
|-id=573 bgcolor=#fefefe
| 209573 ||  || — || December 10, 2004 || Kitt Peak || Spacewatch || — || align=right | 1.2 km || 
|-id=574 bgcolor=#fefefe
| 209574 ||  || — || December 10, 2004 || Socorro || LINEAR || PHO || align=right | 1.9 km || 
|-id=575 bgcolor=#fefefe
| 209575 ||  || — || December 2, 2004 || Kitt Peak || Spacewatch || — || align=right | 1.3 km || 
|-id=576 bgcolor=#E9E9E9
| 209576 ||  || — || December 11, 2004 || Kitt Peak || Spacewatch || — || align=right | 1.3 km || 
|-id=577 bgcolor=#fefefe
| 209577 ||  || — || December 11, 2004 || Kitt Peak || Spacewatch || — || align=right | 1.1 km || 
|-id=578 bgcolor=#fefefe
| 209578 ||  || — || December 11, 2004 || Campo Imperatore || CINEOS || V || align=right data-sort-value="0.96" | 960 m || 
|-id=579 bgcolor=#fefefe
| 209579 ||  || — || December 10, 2004 || Campo Imperatore || CINEOS || — || align=right | 1.3 km || 
|-id=580 bgcolor=#fefefe
| 209580 ||  || — || December 11, 2004 || Kitt Peak || Spacewatch || — || align=right data-sort-value="0.86" | 860 m || 
|-id=581 bgcolor=#fefefe
| 209581 ||  || — || December 14, 2004 || Catalina || CSS || — || align=right | 1.2 km || 
|-id=582 bgcolor=#fefefe
| 209582 ||  || — || December 10, 2004 || Kitt Peak || Spacewatch || — || align=right | 1.5 km || 
|-id=583 bgcolor=#fefefe
| 209583 ||  || — || December 11, 2004 || Socorro || LINEAR || FLO || align=right data-sort-value="0.79" | 790 m || 
|-id=584 bgcolor=#fefefe
| 209584 ||  || — || December 11, 2004 || Socorro || LINEAR || — || align=right | 1.2 km || 
|-id=585 bgcolor=#fefefe
| 209585 ||  || — || December 11, 2004 || Socorro || LINEAR || V || align=right | 1.1 km || 
|-id=586 bgcolor=#fefefe
| 209586 ||  || — || December 11, 2004 || Socorro || LINEAR || NYS || align=right | 1.0 km || 
|-id=587 bgcolor=#fefefe
| 209587 ||  || — || December 14, 2004 || Anderson Mesa || LONEOS || — || align=right | 1.3 km || 
|-id=588 bgcolor=#fefefe
| 209588 ||  || — || December 13, 2004 || Kitt Peak || Spacewatch || — || align=right data-sort-value="0.90" | 900 m || 
|-id=589 bgcolor=#fefefe
| 209589 ||  || — || December 14, 2004 || Socorro || LINEAR || NYS || align=right data-sort-value="0.94" | 940 m || 
|-id=590 bgcolor=#fefefe
| 209590 ||  || — || December 15, 2004 || Socorro || LINEAR || NYS || align=right | 1.0 km || 
|-id=591 bgcolor=#fefefe
| 209591 ||  || — || December 14, 2004 || Socorro || LINEAR || — || align=right data-sort-value="0.96" | 960 m || 
|-id=592 bgcolor=#fefefe
| 209592 ||  || — || December 15, 2004 || Socorro || LINEAR || — || align=right | 1.2 km || 
|-id=593 bgcolor=#fefefe
| 209593 ||  || — || December 15, 2004 || Socorro || LINEAR || — || align=right | 1.0 km || 
|-id=594 bgcolor=#E9E9E9
| 209594 ||  || — || December 14, 2004 || Socorro || LINEAR || — || align=right | 1.4 km || 
|-id=595 bgcolor=#fefefe
| 209595 ||  || — || December 15, 2004 || Socorro || LINEAR || V || align=right data-sort-value="0.84" | 840 m || 
|-id=596 bgcolor=#fefefe
| 209596 ||  || — || December 14, 2004 || Kitt Peak || Spacewatch || — || align=right | 1.5 km || 
|-id=597 bgcolor=#fefefe
| 209597 ||  || — || December 2, 2004 || Palomar || NEAT || NYS || align=right data-sort-value="0.96" | 960 m || 
|-id=598 bgcolor=#fefefe
| 209598 ||  || — || December 11, 2004 || Kitt Peak || Spacewatch || — || align=right | 1.2 km || 
|-id=599 bgcolor=#fefefe
| 209599 || 2004 YK || — || December 17, 2004 || Socorro || LINEAR || PHO || align=right | 1.5 km || 
|-id=600 bgcolor=#fefefe
| 209600 ||  || — || December 16, 2004 || Anderson Mesa || LONEOS || — || align=right | 1.0 km || 
|}

209601–209700 

|-bgcolor=#fefefe
| 209601 ||  || — || December 17, 2004 || Socorro || LINEAR || FLO || align=right data-sort-value="0.94" | 940 m || 
|-id=602 bgcolor=#fefefe
| 209602 ||  || — || December 18, 2004 || Mount Lemmon || Mount Lemmon Survey || NYS || align=right | 1.0 km || 
|-id=603 bgcolor=#fefefe
| 209603 ||  || — || December 18, 2004 || Mount Lemmon || Mount Lemmon Survey || NYS || align=right data-sort-value="0.90" | 900 m || 
|-id=604 bgcolor=#fefefe
| 209604 ||  || — || December 18, 2004 || Mount Lemmon || Mount Lemmon Survey || NYS || align=right | 1.0 km || 
|-id=605 bgcolor=#fefefe
| 209605 ||  || — || December 18, 2004 || Mount Lemmon || Mount Lemmon Survey || SUL || align=right | 3.2 km || 
|-id=606 bgcolor=#E9E9E9
| 209606 ||  || — || December 19, 2004 || Mount Lemmon || Mount Lemmon Survey || EUN || align=right | 1.9 km || 
|-id=607 bgcolor=#fefefe
| 209607 ||  || — || December 17, 2004 || Socorro || LINEAR || — || align=right | 2.5 km || 
|-id=608 bgcolor=#fefefe
| 209608 ||  || — || January 1, 2005 || Catalina || CSS || NYS || align=right | 2.3 km || 
|-id=609 bgcolor=#fefefe
| 209609 ||  || — || January 6, 2005 || Socorro || LINEAR || — || align=right | 1.6 km || 
|-id=610 bgcolor=#E9E9E9
| 209610 ||  || — || January 6, 2005 || Catalina || CSS || — || align=right | 2.2 km || 
|-id=611 bgcolor=#fefefe
| 209611 ||  || — || January 6, 2005 || Catalina || CSS || NYS || align=right | 1.0 km || 
|-id=612 bgcolor=#fefefe
| 209612 ||  || — || January 6, 2005 || Catalina || CSS || — || align=right | 1.4 km || 
|-id=613 bgcolor=#fefefe
| 209613 ||  || — || January 6, 2005 || Catalina || CSS || NYS || align=right data-sort-value="0.94" | 940 m || 
|-id=614 bgcolor=#fefefe
| 209614 ||  || — || January 6, 2005 || Catalina || CSS || V || align=right | 1.2 km || 
|-id=615 bgcolor=#fefefe
| 209615 ||  || — || January 7, 2005 || Nogales || Tenagra II Obs. || NYS || align=right | 1.0 km || 
|-id=616 bgcolor=#fefefe
| 209616 ||  || — || January 6, 2005 || Socorro || LINEAR || NYS || align=right | 1.1 km || 
|-id=617 bgcolor=#fefefe
| 209617 ||  || — || January 6, 2005 || Socorro || LINEAR || — || align=right | 1.2 km || 
|-id=618 bgcolor=#fefefe
| 209618 ||  || — || January 6, 2005 || Socorro || LINEAR || — || align=right | 1.8 km || 
|-id=619 bgcolor=#fefefe
| 209619 ||  || — || January 6, 2005 || Catalina || CSS || — || align=right | 1.1 km || 
|-id=620 bgcolor=#fefefe
| 209620 ||  || — || January 6, 2005 || Socorro || LINEAR || — || align=right | 1.3 km || 
|-id=621 bgcolor=#fefefe
| 209621 ||  || — || January 7, 2005 || Socorro || LINEAR || — || align=right | 1.2 km || 
|-id=622 bgcolor=#fefefe
| 209622 ||  || — || January 11, 2005 || Socorro || LINEAR || MAS || align=right | 1.1 km || 
|-id=623 bgcolor=#fefefe
| 209623 ||  || — || January 15, 2005 || Socorro || LINEAR || NYS || align=right | 1.2 km || 
|-id=624 bgcolor=#fefefe
| 209624 ||  || — || January 15, 2005 || Kitt Peak || Spacewatch || — || align=right | 1.2 km || 
|-id=625 bgcolor=#fefefe
| 209625 ||  || — || January 15, 2005 || Kitt Peak || Spacewatch || — || align=right | 1.1 km || 
|-id=626 bgcolor=#E9E9E9
| 209626 ||  || — || January 1, 2005 || Catalina || CSS || — || align=right | 1.5 km || 
|-id=627 bgcolor=#fefefe
| 209627 ||  || — || January 11, 2005 || Great Shefford || Great Shefford Obs. || V || align=right | 1.1 km || 
|-id=628 bgcolor=#fefefe
| 209628 ||  || — || January 11, 2005 || Socorro || LINEAR || MAS || align=right | 1.1 km || 
|-id=629 bgcolor=#fefefe
| 209629 ||  || — || January 13, 2005 || Socorro || LINEAR || NYS || align=right | 1.2 km || 
|-id=630 bgcolor=#fefefe
| 209630 ||  || — || January 13, 2005 || Catalina || CSS || KLI || align=right | 3.1 km || 
|-id=631 bgcolor=#fefefe
| 209631 ||  || — || January 15, 2005 || Socorro || LINEAR || V || align=right | 1.1 km || 
|-id=632 bgcolor=#fefefe
| 209632 ||  || — || January 15, 2005 || Kitt Peak || Spacewatch || V || align=right data-sort-value="0.95" | 950 m || 
|-id=633 bgcolor=#d6d6d6
| 209633 ||  || — || January 15, 2005 || Kitt Peak || Spacewatch || TEL || align=right | 5.2 km || 
|-id=634 bgcolor=#fefefe
| 209634 || 2005 BK || — || January 16, 2005 || Desert Eagle || W. K. Y. Yeung || MAS || align=right data-sort-value="0.99" | 990 m || 
|-id=635 bgcolor=#fefefe
| 209635 ||  || — || January 17, 2005 || Wrightwood || J. W. Young || — || align=right | 1.1 km || 
|-id=636 bgcolor=#E9E9E9
| 209636 ||  || — || January 17, 2005 || Catalina || CSS || BAR || align=right | 2.8 km || 
|-id=637 bgcolor=#fefefe
| 209637 ||  || — || January 16, 2005 || Socorro || LINEAR || NYS || align=right | 1.00 km || 
|-id=638 bgcolor=#fefefe
| 209638 ||  || — || January 16, 2005 || Kitt Peak || Spacewatch || NYS || align=right data-sort-value="0.92" | 920 m || 
|-id=639 bgcolor=#fefefe
| 209639 ||  || — || January 16, 2005 || Kitt Peak || Spacewatch || — || align=right | 1.0 km || 
|-id=640 bgcolor=#fefefe
| 209640 ||  || — || January 16, 2005 || Kitt Peak || Spacewatch || — || align=right | 2.6 km || 
|-id=641 bgcolor=#fefefe
| 209641 ||  || — || January 17, 2005 || Catalina || CSS || — || align=right | 1.2 km || 
|-id=642 bgcolor=#E9E9E9
| 209642 ||  || — || January 17, 2005 || Catalina || CSS || — || align=right | 2.1 km || 
|-id=643 bgcolor=#fefefe
| 209643 ||  || — || January 29, 2005 || Junk Bond || D. Healy || — || align=right data-sort-value="0.98" | 980 m || 
|-id=644 bgcolor=#fefefe
| 209644 || 2005 CR || — || February 1, 2005 || Palomar || NEAT || — || align=right | 1.4 km || 
|-id=645 bgcolor=#E9E9E9
| 209645 ||  || — || February 1, 2005 || Kitt Peak || Spacewatch || BAR || align=right | 1.8 km || 
|-id=646 bgcolor=#fefefe
| 209646 ||  || — || February 1, 2005 || Kitt Peak || Spacewatch || — || align=right | 1.0 km || 
|-id=647 bgcolor=#fefefe
| 209647 ||  || — || February 1, 2005 || Catalina || CSS || — || align=right | 1.00 km || 
|-id=648 bgcolor=#E9E9E9
| 209648 ||  || — || February 1, 2005 || Catalina || CSS || — || align=right | 1.4 km || 
|-id=649 bgcolor=#E9E9E9
| 209649 ||  || — || February 1, 2005 || Palomar || NEAT || MAR || align=right | 1.5 km || 
|-id=650 bgcolor=#fefefe
| 209650 ||  || — || February 1, 2005 || Kitt Peak || Spacewatch || V || align=right | 1.2 km || 
|-id=651 bgcolor=#E9E9E9
| 209651 ||  || — || February 1, 2005 || Kitt Peak || Spacewatch || — || align=right | 1.5 km || 
|-id=652 bgcolor=#fefefe
| 209652 ||  || — || February 1, 2005 || Kitt Peak || Spacewatch || NYS || align=right data-sort-value="0.95" | 950 m || 
|-id=653 bgcolor=#fefefe
| 209653 ||  || — || February 1, 2005 || Kitt Peak || Spacewatch || — || align=right | 1.3 km || 
|-id=654 bgcolor=#fefefe
| 209654 ||  || — || February 2, 2005 || Socorro || LINEAR || NYS || align=right data-sort-value="0.91" | 910 m || 
|-id=655 bgcolor=#fefefe
| 209655 ||  || — || February 2, 2005 || Catalina || CSS || NYS || align=right | 1.1 km || 
|-id=656 bgcolor=#fefefe
| 209656 ||  || — || February 2, 2005 || Catalina || CSS || MAS || align=right | 1.0 km || 
|-id=657 bgcolor=#fefefe
| 209657 ||  || — || February 2, 2005 || Socorro || LINEAR || — || align=right | 1.4 km || 
|-id=658 bgcolor=#E9E9E9
| 209658 ||  || — || February 2, 2005 || Kitt Peak || Spacewatch || EUN || align=right | 1.5 km || 
|-id=659 bgcolor=#fefefe
| 209659 ||  || — || February 1, 2005 || Kitt Peak || Spacewatch || — || align=right | 1.3 km || 
|-id=660 bgcolor=#fefefe
| 209660 ||  || — || February 1, 2005 || Kitt Peak || Spacewatch || MAS || align=right data-sort-value="0.94" | 940 m || 
|-id=661 bgcolor=#fefefe
| 209661 ||  || — || February 3, 2005 || Socorro || LINEAR || — || align=right | 1.1 km || 
|-id=662 bgcolor=#E9E9E9
| 209662 ||  || — || February 4, 2005 || Bergisch Gladbach || W. Bickel || — || align=right | 1.2 km || 
|-id=663 bgcolor=#E9E9E9
| 209663 ||  || — || February 2, 2005 || Kitt Peak || Spacewatch || — || align=right | 1.9 km || 
|-id=664 bgcolor=#fefefe
| 209664 ||  || — || February 2, 2005 || Kitt Peak || Spacewatch || — || align=right | 1.3 km || 
|-id=665 bgcolor=#fefefe
| 209665 ||  || — || February 2, 2005 || Kitt Peak || Spacewatch || — || align=right | 2.9 km || 
|-id=666 bgcolor=#fefefe
| 209666 ||  || — || February 2, 2005 || Catalina || CSS || — || align=right | 1.7 km || 
|-id=667 bgcolor=#fefefe
| 209667 ||  || — || February 2, 2005 || Catalina || CSS || NYS || align=right data-sort-value="0.92" | 920 m || 
|-id=668 bgcolor=#fefefe
| 209668 ||  || — || February 2, 2005 || Socorro || LINEAR || — || align=right | 1.1 km || 
|-id=669 bgcolor=#E9E9E9
| 209669 ||  || — || February 2, 2005 || Kitt Peak || Spacewatch || MAR || align=right | 1.5 km || 
|-id=670 bgcolor=#fefefe
| 209670 ||  || — || February 2, 2005 || Catalina || CSS || V || align=right | 1.0 km || 
|-id=671 bgcolor=#E9E9E9
| 209671 ||  || — || February 2, 2005 || Socorro || LINEAR || — || align=right | 1.5 km || 
|-id=672 bgcolor=#E9E9E9
| 209672 ||  || — || February 9, 2005 || Anderson Mesa || LONEOS || — || align=right | 5.5 km || 
|-id=673 bgcolor=#E9E9E9
| 209673 ||  || — || February 9, 2005 || Mount Lemmon || Mount Lemmon Survey || — || align=right | 1.4 km || 
|-id=674 bgcolor=#E9E9E9
| 209674 ||  || — || February 9, 2005 || Socorro || LINEAR || ADE || align=right | 2.7 km || 
|-id=675 bgcolor=#fefefe
| 209675 ||  || — || February 28, 2005 || Vicques || M. Ory || V || align=right | 1.2 km || 
|-id=676 bgcolor=#E9E9E9
| 209676 || 2005 EC || — || March 1, 2005 || Kitt Peak || Spacewatch || PAD || align=right | 4.0 km || 
|-id=677 bgcolor=#fefefe
| 209677 || 2005 EM || — || March 1, 2005 || Kitt Peak || Spacewatch || V || align=right | 1.1 km || 
|-id=678 bgcolor=#E9E9E9
| 209678 ||  || — || March 1, 2005 || Kitt Peak || Spacewatch || AER || align=right | 2.1 km || 
|-id=679 bgcolor=#fefefe
| 209679 ||  || — || March 2, 2005 || Kitt Peak || Spacewatch || — || align=right | 1.1 km || 
|-id=680 bgcolor=#fefefe
| 209680 ||  || — || March 2, 2005 || Kitt Peak || Spacewatch || — || align=right data-sort-value="0.91" | 910 m || 
|-id=681 bgcolor=#E9E9E9
| 209681 ||  || — || March 2, 2005 || Catalina || CSS || — || align=right | 1.5 km || 
|-id=682 bgcolor=#E9E9E9
| 209682 ||  || — || March 2, 2005 || Catalina || CSS || — || align=right | 1.7 km || 
|-id=683 bgcolor=#E9E9E9
| 209683 ||  || — || March 2, 2005 || Catalina || CSS || — || align=right | 2.0 km || 
|-id=684 bgcolor=#fefefe
| 209684 ||  || — || March 3, 2005 || Kitt Peak || Spacewatch || NYS || align=right data-sort-value="0.90" | 900 m || 
|-id=685 bgcolor=#E9E9E9
| 209685 ||  || — || March 3, 2005 || Kitt Peak || Spacewatch || — || align=right | 3.3 km || 
|-id=686 bgcolor=#E9E9E9
| 209686 ||  || — || March 3, 2005 || Socorro || LINEAR || — || align=right | 3.6 km || 
|-id=687 bgcolor=#E9E9E9
| 209687 ||  || — || March 3, 2005 || Catalina || CSS || — || align=right | 2.7 km || 
|-id=688 bgcolor=#E9E9E9
| 209688 ||  || — || March 3, 2005 || Catalina || CSS || — || align=right | 1.3 km || 
|-id=689 bgcolor=#fefefe
| 209689 ||  || — || March 3, 2005 || Catalina || CSS || — || align=right | 1.2 km || 
|-id=690 bgcolor=#d6d6d6
| 209690 ||  || — || March 3, 2005 || Catalina || CSS || KOR || align=right | 2.2 km || 
|-id=691 bgcolor=#E9E9E9
| 209691 ||  || — || March 3, 2005 || Catalina || CSS || RAF || align=right | 1.2 km || 
|-id=692 bgcolor=#E9E9E9
| 209692 ||  || — || March 3, 2005 || Catalina || CSS || EUN || align=right | 1.7 km || 
|-id=693 bgcolor=#E9E9E9
| 209693 ||  || — || March 3, 2005 || Catalina || CSS || — || align=right | 1.5 km || 
|-id=694 bgcolor=#E9E9E9
| 209694 ||  || — || March 3, 2005 || Great Shefford || Great Shefford Obs. || — || align=right | 1.6 km || 
|-id=695 bgcolor=#E9E9E9
| 209695 ||  || — || March 2, 2005 || Kitt Peak || Spacewatch || — || align=right | 1.8 km || 
|-id=696 bgcolor=#E9E9E9
| 209696 ||  || — || March 2, 2005 || Catalina || CSS || — || align=right | 1.2 km || 
|-id=697 bgcolor=#E9E9E9
| 209697 ||  || — || March 7, 2005 || RAS || A. Lowe || — || align=right | 1.4 km || 
|-id=698 bgcolor=#E9E9E9
| 209698 ||  || — || March 3, 2005 || Kitt Peak || Spacewatch || — || align=right | 2.3 km || 
|-id=699 bgcolor=#fefefe
| 209699 ||  || — || March 3, 2005 || Catalina || CSS || — || align=right | 1.4 km || 
|-id=700 bgcolor=#E9E9E9
| 209700 ||  || — || March 3, 2005 || Catalina || CSS || — || align=right | 1.5 km || 
|}

209701–209800 

|-bgcolor=#E9E9E9
| 209701 ||  || — || March 3, 2005 || Catalina || CSS || — || align=right | 1.5 km || 
|-id=702 bgcolor=#E9E9E9
| 209702 ||  || — || March 4, 2005 || Kitt Peak || Spacewatch || — || align=right | 1.3 km || 
|-id=703 bgcolor=#E9E9E9
| 209703 ||  || — || March 4, 2005 || Kitt Peak || Spacewatch || — || align=right | 3.3 km || 
|-id=704 bgcolor=#fefefe
| 209704 ||  || — || March 4, 2005 || Mount Lemmon || Mount Lemmon Survey || V || align=right data-sort-value="0.94" | 940 m || 
|-id=705 bgcolor=#fefefe
| 209705 ||  || — || March 4, 2005 || Kitt Peak || Spacewatch || — || align=right | 1.2 km || 
|-id=706 bgcolor=#fefefe
| 209706 ||  || — || March 4, 2005 || Socorro || LINEAR || NYS || align=right data-sort-value="0.93" | 930 m || 
|-id=707 bgcolor=#E9E9E9
| 209707 ||  || — || March 3, 2005 || Kitt Peak || Spacewatch || HNS || align=right | 1.5 km || 
|-id=708 bgcolor=#E9E9E9
| 209708 ||  || — || March 3, 2005 || Kitt Peak || Spacewatch || — || align=right | 1.4 km || 
|-id=709 bgcolor=#E9E9E9
| 209709 ||  || — || March 3, 2005 || Kitt Peak || Spacewatch || — || align=right | 2.1 km || 
|-id=710 bgcolor=#E9E9E9
| 209710 ||  || — || March 3, 2005 || Kitt Peak || Spacewatch || — || align=right | 1.1 km || 
|-id=711 bgcolor=#E9E9E9
| 209711 ||  || — || March 4, 2005 || Catalina || CSS || JUN || align=right | 1.8 km || 
|-id=712 bgcolor=#E9E9E9
| 209712 ||  || — || March 8, 2005 || Anderson Mesa || LONEOS || — || align=right | 1.5 km || 
|-id=713 bgcolor=#E9E9E9
| 209713 ||  || — || March 11, 2005 || RAS || A. Lowe || — || align=right | 1.2 km || 
|-id=714 bgcolor=#E9E9E9
| 209714 ||  || — || March 3, 2005 || Catalina || CSS || — || align=right | 1.3 km || 
|-id=715 bgcolor=#E9E9E9
| 209715 ||  || — || March 3, 2005 || Catalina || CSS || — || align=right | 1.4 km || 
|-id=716 bgcolor=#E9E9E9
| 209716 ||  || — || March 4, 2005 || Kitt Peak || Spacewatch || — || align=right | 1.1 km || 
|-id=717 bgcolor=#E9E9E9
| 209717 ||  || — || March 8, 2005 || Anderson Mesa || LONEOS || — || align=right | 2.1 km || 
|-id=718 bgcolor=#E9E9E9
| 209718 ||  || — || March 8, 2005 || Anderson Mesa || LONEOS || — || align=right | 2.2 km || 
|-id=719 bgcolor=#fefefe
| 209719 ||  || — || March 9, 2005 || Mount Lemmon || Mount Lemmon Survey || V || align=right data-sort-value="0.72" | 720 m || 
|-id=720 bgcolor=#E9E9E9
| 209720 ||  || — || March 9, 2005 || Kitt Peak || Spacewatch || RAF || align=right | 1.4 km || 
|-id=721 bgcolor=#E9E9E9
| 209721 ||  || — || March 9, 2005 || Catalina || CSS || EUN || align=right | 1.5 km || 
|-id=722 bgcolor=#E9E9E9
| 209722 ||  || — || March 9, 2005 || Anderson Mesa || LONEOS || — || align=right | 4.0 km || 
|-id=723 bgcolor=#fefefe
| 209723 ||  || — || March 10, 2005 || Mount Lemmon || Mount Lemmon Survey || NYS || align=right data-sort-value="0.88" | 880 m || 
|-id=724 bgcolor=#E9E9E9
| 209724 ||  || — || March 10, 2005 || Mount Lemmon || Mount Lemmon Survey || — || align=right | 1.8 km || 
|-id=725 bgcolor=#E9E9E9
| 209725 ||  || — || March 10, 2005 || Kitt Peak || Spacewatch || HOF || align=right | 3.3 km || 
|-id=726 bgcolor=#E9E9E9
| 209726 ||  || — || March 8, 2005 || Mount Lemmon || Mount Lemmon Survey || — || align=right | 1.3 km || 
|-id=727 bgcolor=#d6d6d6
| 209727 ||  || — || March 9, 2005 || Mount Lemmon || Mount Lemmon Survey || — || align=right | 4.2 km || 
|-id=728 bgcolor=#E9E9E9
| 209728 ||  || — || March 9, 2005 || Mount Lemmon || Mount Lemmon Survey || AST || align=right | 3.5 km || 
|-id=729 bgcolor=#E9E9E9
| 209729 ||  || — || March 9, 2005 || Siding Spring || SSS || MIT || align=right | 3.7 km || 
|-id=730 bgcolor=#E9E9E9
| 209730 ||  || — || March 11, 2005 || Kitt Peak || Spacewatch || — || align=right | 1.9 km || 
|-id=731 bgcolor=#E9E9E9
| 209731 ||  || — || March 11, 2005 || Mount Lemmon || Mount Lemmon Survey || — || align=right | 2.0 km || 
|-id=732 bgcolor=#E9E9E9
| 209732 ||  || — || March 11, 2005 || Mount Lemmon || Mount Lemmon Survey || — || align=right | 1.4 km || 
|-id=733 bgcolor=#fefefe
| 209733 ||  || — || March 8, 2005 || Mount Lemmon || Mount Lemmon Survey || MAS || align=right data-sort-value="0.96" | 960 m || 
|-id=734 bgcolor=#E9E9E9
| 209734 ||  || — || March 8, 2005 || Kitt Peak || Spacewatch || — || align=right | 1.5 km || 
|-id=735 bgcolor=#E9E9E9
| 209735 ||  || — || March 8, 2005 || Kitt Peak || Spacewatch || AGN || align=right | 1.5 km || 
|-id=736 bgcolor=#fefefe
| 209736 ||  || — || March 9, 2005 || Mount Lemmon || Mount Lemmon Survey || V || align=right data-sort-value="0.95" | 950 m || 
|-id=737 bgcolor=#E9E9E9
| 209737 ||  || — || March 9, 2005 || Mount Lemmon || Mount Lemmon Survey || — || align=right | 1.9 km || 
|-id=738 bgcolor=#E9E9E9
| 209738 ||  || — || March 9, 2005 || Mount Lemmon || Mount Lemmon Survey || — || align=right | 2.2 km || 
|-id=739 bgcolor=#E9E9E9
| 209739 ||  || — || March 9, 2005 || Kitt Peak || Spacewatch || — || align=right | 2.7 km || 
|-id=740 bgcolor=#E9E9E9
| 209740 ||  || — || March 10, 2005 || Anderson Mesa || LONEOS || — || align=right | 2.5 km || 
|-id=741 bgcolor=#E9E9E9
| 209741 ||  || — || March 10, 2005 || Catalina || CSS || — || align=right | 2.2 km || 
|-id=742 bgcolor=#E9E9E9
| 209742 ||  || — || March 11, 2005 || Mount Lemmon || Mount Lemmon Survey || — || align=right | 1.8 km || 
|-id=743 bgcolor=#fefefe
| 209743 ||  || — || March 11, 2005 || Socorro || LINEAR || — || align=right | 1.5 km || 
|-id=744 bgcolor=#E9E9E9
| 209744 ||  || — || March 11, 2005 || Mount Lemmon || Mount Lemmon Survey || — || align=right | 3.8 km || 
|-id=745 bgcolor=#E9E9E9
| 209745 ||  || — || March 11, 2005 || Mount Lemmon || Mount Lemmon Survey || — || align=right | 2.7 km || 
|-id=746 bgcolor=#E9E9E9
| 209746 ||  || — || March 11, 2005 || Mount Lemmon || Mount Lemmon Survey || — || align=right | 1.2 km || 
|-id=747 bgcolor=#fefefe
| 209747 ||  || — || March 11, 2005 || Kitt Peak || Spacewatch || — || align=right | 1.1 km || 
|-id=748 bgcolor=#fefefe
| 209748 ||  || — || March 12, 2005 || Socorro || LINEAR || — || align=right | 1.1 km || 
|-id=749 bgcolor=#E9E9E9
| 209749 ||  || — || March 13, 2005 || Catalina || CSS || — || align=right | 1.4 km || 
|-id=750 bgcolor=#E9E9E9
| 209750 ||  || — || March 13, 2005 || Kitt Peak || Spacewatch || — || align=right | 2.1 km || 
|-id=751 bgcolor=#fefefe
| 209751 ||  || — || March 4, 2005 || Kitt Peak || Spacewatch || — || align=right | 1.8 km || 
|-id=752 bgcolor=#E9E9E9
| 209752 ||  || — || March 4, 2005 || Kitt Peak || Spacewatch || NEM || align=right | 3.2 km || 
|-id=753 bgcolor=#fefefe
| 209753 ||  || — || March 4, 2005 || Socorro || LINEAR || MAS || align=right | 1.2 km || 
|-id=754 bgcolor=#E9E9E9
| 209754 ||  || — || March 9, 2005 || Anderson Mesa || LONEOS || — || align=right | 1.2 km || 
|-id=755 bgcolor=#fefefe
| 209755 ||  || — || March 10, 2005 || Mount Lemmon || Mount Lemmon Survey || NYS || align=right data-sort-value="0.95" | 950 m || 
|-id=756 bgcolor=#E9E9E9
| 209756 ||  || — || March 11, 2005 || Kitt Peak || Spacewatch || — || align=right | 1.9 km || 
|-id=757 bgcolor=#E9E9E9
| 209757 ||  || — || March 1, 2005 || Catalina || CSS || HNS || align=right | 1.7 km || 
|-id=758 bgcolor=#E9E9E9
| 209758 ||  || — || March 10, 2005 || Anderson Mesa || LONEOS || HNS || align=right | 1.8 km || 
|-id=759 bgcolor=#E9E9E9
| 209759 ||  || — || March 10, 2005 || Mount Lemmon || Mount Lemmon Survey || HEN || align=right | 1.2 km || 
|-id=760 bgcolor=#E9E9E9
| 209760 ||  || — || March 11, 2005 || Kitt Peak || Spacewatch || — || align=right | 1.2 km || 
|-id=761 bgcolor=#E9E9E9
| 209761 ||  || — || March 12, 2005 || Kitt Peak || Spacewatch || — || align=right | 2.2 km || 
|-id=762 bgcolor=#E9E9E9
| 209762 ||  || — || March 12, 2005 || Kitt Peak || Spacewatch || — || align=right | 2.0 km || 
|-id=763 bgcolor=#E9E9E9
| 209763 ||  || — || March 11, 2005 || Anderson Mesa || LONEOS || BRG || align=right | 2.0 km || 
|-id=764 bgcolor=#E9E9E9
| 209764 ||  || — || March 11, 2005 || Mount Lemmon || Mount Lemmon Survey || — || align=right | 1.5 km || 
|-id=765 bgcolor=#E9E9E9
| 209765 ||  || — || March 11, 2005 || Mount Lemmon || Mount Lemmon Survey || XIZ || align=right | 1.8 km || 
|-id=766 bgcolor=#E9E9E9
| 209766 ||  || — || March 10, 2005 || Catalina || CSS || — || align=right | 1.9 km || 
|-id=767 bgcolor=#E9E9E9
| 209767 ||  || — || March 10, 2005 || Catalina || CSS || — || align=right | 2.7 km || 
|-id=768 bgcolor=#E9E9E9
| 209768 ||  || — || March 12, 2005 || Kitt Peak || Spacewatch || — || align=right | 1.5 km || 
|-id=769 bgcolor=#fefefe
| 209769 ||  || — || March 12, 2005 || Socorro || LINEAR || — || align=right | 1.3 km || 
|-id=770 bgcolor=#E9E9E9
| 209770 ||  || — || March 7, 2005 || Socorro || LINEAR || — || align=right | 1.5 km || 
|-id=771 bgcolor=#E9E9E9
| 209771 ||  || — || March 10, 2005 || Catalina || CSS || — || align=right | 1.8 km || 
|-id=772 bgcolor=#E9E9E9
| 209772 ||  || — || March 10, 2005 || Catalina || CSS || — || align=right | 2.1 km || 
|-id=773 bgcolor=#E9E9E9
| 209773 ||  || — || March 11, 2005 || Kitt Peak || M. W. Buie || — || align=right | 1.00 km || 
|-id=774 bgcolor=#E9E9E9
| 209774 ||  || — || March 12, 2005 || Kitt Peak || M. W. Buie || — || align=right | 2.5 km || 
|-id=775 bgcolor=#fefefe
| 209775 ||  || — || March 4, 2005 || Kitt Peak || Spacewatch || — || align=right data-sort-value="0.93" | 930 m || 
|-id=776 bgcolor=#fefefe
| 209776 ||  || — || March 3, 2005 || Catalina || CSS || — || align=right | 1.1 km || 
|-id=777 bgcolor=#E9E9E9
| 209777 ||  || — || March 31, 2005 || Anderson Mesa || LONEOS || — || align=right | 1.6 km || 
|-id=778 bgcolor=#E9E9E9
| 209778 ||  || — || April 2, 2005 || Ottmarsheim || Ottmarsheim Obs. || — || align=right | 1.2 km || 
|-id=779 bgcolor=#fefefe
| 209779 ||  || — || April 1, 2005 || Catalina || CSS || PHO || align=right | 2.0 km || 
|-id=780 bgcolor=#fefefe
| 209780 ||  || — || April 1, 2005 || Catalina || CSS || — || align=right | 1.7 km || 
|-id=781 bgcolor=#E9E9E9
| 209781 ||  || — || April 1, 2005 || Kitt Peak || Spacewatch || GEF || align=right | 1.7 km || 
|-id=782 bgcolor=#E9E9E9
| 209782 ||  || — || April 1, 2005 || Kitt Peak || Spacewatch || JUN || align=right | 1.4 km || 
|-id=783 bgcolor=#E9E9E9
| 209783 ||  || — || April 1, 2005 || Anderson Mesa || LONEOS || EUN || align=right | 2.1 km || 
|-id=784 bgcolor=#E9E9E9
| 209784 ||  || — || April 2, 2005 || Anderson Mesa || LONEOS || — || align=right | 4.6 km || 
|-id=785 bgcolor=#E9E9E9
| 209785 ||  || — || April 1, 2005 || Reedy Creek || J. Broughton || — || align=right | 4.0 km || 
|-id=786 bgcolor=#E9E9E9
| 209786 ||  || — || April 1, 2005 || Kitt Peak || Spacewatch || WIT || align=right | 1.5 km || 
|-id=787 bgcolor=#E9E9E9
| 209787 ||  || — || April 1, 2005 || Anderson Mesa || LONEOS || MIT || align=right | 3.8 km || 
|-id=788 bgcolor=#E9E9E9
| 209788 ||  || — || April 1, 2005 || Anderson Mesa || LONEOS || — || align=right | 2.5 km || 
|-id=789 bgcolor=#E9E9E9
| 209789 ||  || — || April 3, 2005 || Palomar || NEAT || — || align=right | 1.4 km || 
|-id=790 bgcolor=#E9E9E9
| 209790 ||  || — || April 3, 2005 || Palomar || NEAT || HEN || align=right | 1.8 km || 
|-id=791 bgcolor=#E9E9E9
| 209791 Tokaj ||  ||  || April 1, 2005 || Piszkéstető || K. Sárneczky || — || align=right | 1.8 km || 
|-id=792 bgcolor=#E9E9E9
| 209792 ||  || — || April 2, 2005 || Mount Lemmon || Mount Lemmon Survey || — || align=right | 1.5 km || 
|-id=793 bgcolor=#fefefe
| 209793 ||  || — || April 2, 2005 || Mount Lemmon || Mount Lemmon Survey || ERI || align=right | 2.5 km || 
|-id=794 bgcolor=#E9E9E9
| 209794 ||  || — || April 2, 2005 || Kitt Peak || Spacewatch || EUN || align=right | 1.9 km || 
|-id=795 bgcolor=#E9E9E9
| 209795 ||  || — || April 6, 2005 || RAS || A. Lowe || — || align=right | 3.6 km || 
|-id=796 bgcolor=#fefefe
| 209796 ||  || — || April 5, 2005 || Mount Lemmon || Mount Lemmon Survey || — || align=right | 1.1 km || 
|-id=797 bgcolor=#E9E9E9
| 209797 ||  || — || April 5, 2005 || Mount Lemmon || Mount Lemmon Survey || — || align=right | 1.1 km || 
|-id=798 bgcolor=#E9E9E9
| 209798 ||  || — || April 5, 2005 || Mount Lemmon || Mount Lemmon Survey || — || align=right | 1.2 km || 
|-id=799 bgcolor=#E9E9E9
| 209799 ||  || — || April 5, 2005 || Mount Lemmon || Mount Lemmon Survey || — || align=right | 1.4 km || 
|-id=800 bgcolor=#E9E9E9
| 209800 ||  || — || April 4, 2005 || Mount Lemmon || Mount Lemmon Survey || — || align=right | 1.3 km || 
|}

209801–209900 

|-bgcolor=#E9E9E9
| 209801 ||  || — || April 5, 2005 || Mount Lemmon || Mount Lemmon Survey || HOF || align=right | 3.6 km || 
|-id=802 bgcolor=#E9E9E9
| 209802 ||  || — || April 4, 2005 || Catalina || CSS || MIT || align=right | 3.0 km || 
|-id=803 bgcolor=#E9E9E9
| 209803 ||  || — || April 6, 2005 || Anderson Mesa || LONEOS || — || align=right | 2.5 km || 
|-id=804 bgcolor=#E9E9E9
| 209804 ||  || — || April 6, 2005 || Jarnac || Jarnac Obs. || — || align=right | 2.0 km || 
|-id=805 bgcolor=#E9E9E9
| 209805 ||  || — || April 8, 2005 || Needville || Needville Obs. || — || align=right | 1.5 km || 
|-id=806 bgcolor=#E9E9E9
| 209806 ||  || — || April 2, 2005 || Catalina || CSS || — || align=right | 1.4 km || 
|-id=807 bgcolor=#E9E9E9
| 209807 ||  || — || April 2, 2005 || Mount Lemmon || Mount Lemmon Survey || HEN || align=right | 1.4 km || 
|-id=808 bgcolor=#E9E9E9
| 209808 ||  || — || April 2, 2005 || Mount Lemmon || Mount Lemmon Survey || AST || align=right | 3.3 km || 
|-id=809 bgcolor=#E9E9E9
| 209809 ||  || — || April 2, 2005 || Mount Lemmon || Mount Lemmon Survey || — || align=right | 1.1 km || 
|-id=810 bgcolor=#E9E9E9
| 209810 ||  || — || April 4, 2005 || Catalina || CSS || — || align=right | 1.6 km || 
|-id=811 bgcolor=#E9E9E9
| 209811 ||  || — || April 6, 2005 || Catalina || CSS || — || align=right | 2.0 km || 
|-id=812 bgcolor=#E9E9E9
| 209812 ||  || — || April 6, 2005 || Catalina || CSS || EUN || align=right | 2.0 km || 
|-id=813 bgcolor=#E9E9E9
| 209813 ||  || — || April 7, 2005 || Anderson Mesa || LONEOS || — || align=right | 2.6 km || 
|-id=814 bgcolor=#E9E9E9
| 209814 ||  || — || April 7, 2005 || Mount Lemmon || Mount Lemmon Survey || — || align=right | 1.4 km || 
|-id=815 bgcolor=#E9E9E9
| 209815 ||  || — || April 4, 2005 || Catalina || CSS || — || align=right | 2.7 km || 
|-id=816 bgcolor=#E9E9E9
| 209816 ||  || — || April 5, 2005 || Catalina || CSS || EUN || align=right | 1.9 km || 
|-id=817 bgcolor=#E9E9E9
| 209817 ||  || — || April 5, 2005 || Mount Lemmon || Mount Lemmon Survey || HEN || align=right | 1.3 km || 
|-id=818 bgcolor=#E9E9E9
| 209818 ||  || — || April 6, 2005 || Kitt Peak || Spacewatch || MIS || align=right | 3.2 km || 
|-id=819 bgcolor=#E9E9E9
| 209819 ||  || — || April 8, 2005 || Socorro || LINEAR || — || align=right | 2.8 km || 
|-id=820 bgcolor=#E9E9E9
| 209820 ||  || — || April 9, 2005 || Socorro || LINEAR || — || align=right | 2.2 km || 
|-id=821 bgcolor=#E9E9E9
| 209821 ||  || — || April 9, 2005 || Kitt Peak || Spacewatch || — || align=right | 2.5 km || 
|-id=822 bgcolor=#d6d6d6
| 209822 ||  || — || April 5, 2005 || Mount Lemmon || Mount Lemmon Survey || — || align=right | 2.8 km || 
|-id=823 bgcolor=#d6d6d6
| 209823 ||  || — || April 10, 2005 || Mount Lemmon || Mount Lemmon Survey || — || align=right | 2.9 km || 
|-id=824 bgcolor=#d6d6d6
| 209824 ||  || — || April 10, 2005 || Kitt Peak || Spacewatch || — || align=right | 3.6 km || 
|-id=825 bgcolor=#E9E9E9
| 209825 ||  || — || April 10, 2005 || Kitt Peak || Spacewatch || — || align=right | 3.8 km || 
|-id=826 bgcolor=#E9E9E9
| 209826 ||  || — || April 11, 2005 || Kitt Peak || Spacewatch || — || align=right | 1.8 km || 
|-id=827 bgcolor=#E9E9E9
| 209827 ||  || — || April 12, 2005 || Kitt Peak || Spacewatch || — || align=right | 2.3 km || 
|-id=828 bgcolor=#E9E9E9
| 209828 ||  || — || April 12, 2005 || Socorro || LINEAR || — || align=right | 1.4 km || 
|-id=829 bgcolor=#E9E9E9
| 209829 ||  || — || April 13, 2005 || Socorro || LINEAR || — || align=right | 2.1 km || 
|-id=830 bgcolor=#E9E9E9
| 209830 ||  || — || April 13, 2005 || Catalina || CSS || GER || align=right | 1.7 km || 
|-id=831 bgcolor=#E9E9E9
| 209831 ||  || — || April 11, 2005 || Kitt Peak || Spacewatch || — || align=right | 1.3 km || 
|-id=832 bgcolor=#E9E9E9
| 209832 ||  || — || April 11, 2005 || Kitt Peak || Spacewatch || — || align=right | 1.9 km || 
|-id=833 bgcolor=#E9E9E9
| 209833 ||  || — || April 12, 2005 || Kitt Peak || Spacewatch || — || align=right | 2.6 km || 
|-id=834 bgcolor=#E9E9E9
| 209834 ||  || — || April 12, 2005 || Kitt Peak || Spacewatch || — || align=right | 2.5 km || 
|-id=835 bgcolor=#E9E9E9
| 209835 ||  || — || April 13, 2005 || Anderson Mesa || LONEOS || GEF || align=right | 2.0 km || 
|-id=836 bgcolor=#E9E9E9
| 209836 ||  || — || April 13, 2005 || Kitt Peak || Spacewatch || — || align=right | 2.0 km || 
|-id=837 bgcolor=#E9E9E9
| 209837 ||  || — || April 8, 2005 || Socorro || LINEAR || — || align=right | 2.6 km || 
|-id=838 bgcolor=#E9E9E9
| 209838 ||  || — || April 10, 2005 || Mount Lemmon || Mount Lemmon Survey || MIS || align=right | 2.8 km || 
|-id=839 bgcolor=#E9E9E9
| 209839 ||  || — || April 10, 2005 || Mount Lemmon || Mount Lemmon Survey || — || align=right | 1.8 km || 
|-id=840 bgcolor=#E9E9E9
| 209840 ||  || — || April 13, 2005 || Socorro || LINEAR || ADE || align=right | 3.8 km || 
|-id=841 bgcolor=#E9E9E9
| 209841 ||  || — || April 10, 2005 || Catalina || CSS || — || align=right | 1.7 km || 
|-id=842 bgcolor=#d6d6d6
| 209842 ||  || — || April 10, 2005 || Mount Lemmon || Mount Lemmon Survey || — || align=right | 3.8 km || 
|-id=843 bgcolor=#d6d6d6
| 209843 ||  || — || April 11, 2005 || Mount Lemmon || Mount Lemmon Survey || KOR || align=right | 1.9 km || 
|-id=844 bgcolor=#E9E9E9
| 209844 ||  || — || April 12, 2005 || Kitt Peak || Spacewatch || — || align=right | 3.5 km || 
|-id=845 bgcolor=#E9E9E9
| 209845 ||  || — || April 14, 2005 || Kitt Peak || Spacewatch || — || align=right | 3.9 km || 
|-id=846 bgcolor=#E9E9E9
| 209846 ||  || — || April 6, 2005 || Mount Lemmon || Mount Lemmon Survey || — || align=right | 2.0 km || 
|-id=847 bgcolor=#E9E9E9
| 209847 ||  || — || April 9, 2005 || Catalina || CSS || HNS || align=right | 1.6 km || 
|-id=848 bgcolor=#E9E9E9
| 209848 ||  || — || April 30, 2005 || Kitt Peak || Spacewatch || RAF || align=right | 1.9 km || 
|-id=849 bgcolor=#E9E9E9
| 209849 ||  || — || April 30, 2005 || Kitt Peak || Spacewatch || — || align=right | 2.6 km || 
|-id=850 bgcolor=#E9E9E9
| 209850 || 2005 JJ || — || May 1, 2005 || Kitt Peak || Spacewatch || MIT || align=right | 4.5 km || 
|-id=851 bgcolor=#E9E9E9
| 209851 ||  || — || May 2, 2005 || Kitt Peak || Spacewatch || AGN || align=right | 1.7 km || 
|-id=852 bgcolor=#E9E9E9
| 209852 ||  || — || May 4, 2005 || Catalina || CSS || — || align=right | 3.6 km || 
|-id=853 bgcolor=#E9E9E9
| 209853 ||  || — || May 3, 2005 || Catalina || CSS || MAR || align=right | 1.6 km || 
|-id=854 bgcolor=#E9E9E9
| 209854 ||  || — || May 3, 2005 || Kitt Peak || Spacewatch || PAD || align=right | 2.3 km || 
|-id=855 bgcolor=#E9E9E9
| 209855 ||  || — || May 3, 2005 || Catalina || CSS || — || align=right | 4.1 km || 
|-id=856 bgcolor=#E9E9E9
| 209856 ||  || — || May 3, 2005 || Kitt Peak || Spacewatch || — || align=right | 2.9 km || 
|-id=857 bgcolor=#d6d6d6
| 209857 ||  || — || May 3, 2005 || Kitt Peak || Spacewatch || ITH || align=right | 1.9 km || 
|-id=858 bgcolor=#E9E9E9
| 209858 ||  || — || May 4, 2005 || Palomar || NEAT || — || align=right | 4.2 km || 
|-id=859 bgcolor=#d6d6d6
| 209859 ||  || — || May 4, 2005 || Socorro || LINEAR || — || align=right | 4.3 km || 
|-id=860 bgcolor=#E9E9E9
| 209860 ||  || — || May 4, 2005 || Palomar || NEAT || — || align=right | 2.7 km || 
|-id=861 bgcolor=#E9E9E9
| 209861 ||  || — || May 4, 2005 || Siding Spring || SSS || RAF || align=right | 3.9 km || 
|-id=862 bgcolor=#E9E9E9
| 209862 ||  || — || May 5, 2005 || Palomar || NEAT || — || align=right | 4.6 km || 
|-id=863 bgcolor=#E9E9E9
| 209863 ||  || — || May 7, 2005 || Kitt Peak || Spacewatch || — || align=right | 2.2 km || 
|-id=864 bgcolor=#E9E9E9
| 209864 ||  || — || May 4, 2005 || Kitt Peak || Spacewatch || AGN || align=right | 1.7 km || 
|-id=865 bgcolor=#E9E9E9
| 209865 ||  || — || May 8, 2005 || Kitt Peak || Spacewatch || AGN || align=right | 1.3 km || 
|-id=866 bgcolor=#E9E9E9
| 209866 ||  || — || May 4, 2005 || Palomar || NEAT || — || align=right | 2.8 km || 
|-id=867 bgcolor=#E9E9E9
| 209867 ||  || — || May 4, 2005 || Mount Lemmon || Mount Lemmon Survey || AST || align=right | 2.4 km || 
|-id=868 bgcolor=#d6d6d6
| 209868 ||  || — || May 4, 2005 || Palomar || NEAT || — || align=right | 3.0 km || 
|-id=869 bgcolor=#E9E9E9
| 209869 ||  || — || May 6, 2005 || Socorro || LINEAR || — || align=right | 3.0 km || 
|-id=870 bgcolor=#E9E9E9
| 209870 ||  || — || May 6, 2005 || Socorro || LINEAR || — || align=right | 2.7 km || 
|-id=871 bgcolor=#E9E9E9
| 209871 ||  || — || May 6, 2005 || Socorro || LINEAR || — || align=right | 3.0 km || 
|-id=872 bgcolor=#E9E9E9
| 209872 ||  || — || May 10, 2005 || Anderson Mesa || LONEOS || — || align=right | 3.0 km || 
|-id=873 bgcolor=#E9E9E9
| 209873 ||  || — || May 6, 2005 || Catalina || CSS || ADE || align=right | 3.9 km || 
|-id=874 bgcolor=#E9E9E9
| 209874 ||  || — || May 11, 2005 || Palomar || NEAT || EUN || align=right | 2.0 km || 
|-id=875 bgcolor=#E9E9E9
| 209875 ||  || — || May 11, 2005 || Palomar || NEAT || — || align=right | 3.4 km || 
|-id=876 bgcolor=#E9E9E9
| 209876 ||  || — || May 10, 2005 || Kitt Peak || Spacewatch || — || align=right | 2.3 km || 
|-id=877 bgcolor=#d6d6d6
| 209877 ||  || — || May 13, 2005 || Mount Lemmon || Mount Lemmon Survey || KOR || align=right | 2.1 km || 
|-id=878 bgcolor=#d6d6d6
| 209878 ||  || — || May 14, 2005 || Mount Lemmon || Mount Lemmon Survey || — || align=right | 2.6 km || 
|-id=879 bgcolor=#d6d6d6
| 209879 ||  || — || May 14, 2005 || Kitt Peak || Spacewatch || — || align=right | 4.4 km || 
|-id=880 bgcolor=#E9E9E9
| 209880 ||  || — || May 3, 2005 || Kitt Peak || Spacewatch || HOF || align=right | 3.1 km || 
|-id=881 bgcolor=#E9E9E9
| 209881 ||  || — || May 6, 2005 || Catalina || CSS || — || align=right | 2.2 km || 
|-id=882 bgcolor=#d6d6d6
| 209882 ||  || — || May 9, 2005 || Anderson Mesa || LONEOS || CHA || align=right | 2.7 km || 
|-id=883 bgcolor=#d6d6d6
| 209883 ||  || — || May 10, 2005 || Cerro Tololo || M. W. Buie || — || align=right | 2.6 km || 
|-id=884 bgcolor=#E9E9E9
| 209884 ||  || — || May 11, 2005 || Catalina || CSS || — || align=right | 2.8 km || 
|-id=885 bgcolor=#d6d6d6
| 209885 ||  || — || May 14, 2005 || Mount Lemmon || Mount Lemmon Survey || HYG || align=right | 3.0 km || 
|-id=886 bgcolor=#E9E9E9
| 209886 ||  || — || May 16, 2005 || Mount Lemmon || Mount Lemmon Survey || — || align=right | 3.1 km || 
|-id=887 bgcolor=#E9E9E9
| 209887 ||  || — || June 1, 2005 || Reedy Creek || J. Broughton || — || align=right | 4.0 km || 
|-id=888 bgcolor=#d6d6d6
| 209888 ||  || — || June 1, 2005 || Kitt Peak || Spacewatch || — || align=right | 4.5 km || 
|-id=889 bgcolor=#d6d6d6
| 209889 ||  || — || June 1, 2005 || Kitt Peak || Spacewatch || — || align=right | 4.4 km || 
|-id=890 bgcolor=#d6d6d6
| 209890 ||  || — || June 3, 2005 || Catalina || CSS || — || align=right | 3.8 km || 
|-id=891 bgcolor=#E9E9E9
| 209891 ||  || — || June 3, 2005 || Kitt Peak || Spacewatch || — || align=right | 2.4 km || 
|-id=892 bgcolor=#E9E9E9
| 209892 ||  || — || June 5, 2005 || Socorro || LINEAR || — || align=right | 1.8 km || 
|-id=893 bgcolor=#d6d6d6
| 209893 ||  || — || June 8, 2005 || Kitt Peak || Spacewatch || TEL || align=right | 2.1 km || 
|-id=894 bgcolor=#d6d6d6
| 209894 ||  || — || June 10, 2005 || Kitt Peak || Spacewatch || KAR || align=right | 1.6 km || 
|-id=895 bgcolor=#d6d6d6
| 209895 ||  || — || June 12, 2005 || Kitt Peak || Spacewatch || — || align=right | 4.4 km || 
|-id=896 bgcolor=#d6d6d6
| 209896 ||  || — || June 27, 2005 || Kitt Peak || Spacewatch || HYG || align=right | 4.0 km || 
|-id=897 bgcolor=#d6d6d6
| 209897 ||  || — || June 29, 2005 || Anderson Mesa || LONEOS || — || align=right | 5.6 km || 
|-id=898 bgcolor=#d6d6d6
| 209898 ||  || — || June 30, 2005 || Catalina || CSS || — || align=right | 3.9 km || 
|-id=899 bgcolor=#d6d6d6
| 209899 ||  || — || June 29, 2005 || Kitt Peak || Spacewatch || HYG || align=right | 3.8 km || 
|-id=900 bgcolor=#d6d6d6
| 209900 ||  || — || June 29, 2005 || Kitt Peak || Spacewatch || — || align=right | 4.2 km || 
|}

209901–210000 

|-bgcolor=#fefefe
| 209901 ||  || — || June 27, 2005 || Kitt Peak || Spacewatch || H || align=right | 1.3 km || 
|-id=902 bgcolor=#d6d6d6
| 209902 ||  || — || June 29, 2005 || Kitt Peak || Spacewatch || — || align=right | 3.8 km || 
|-id=903 bgcolor=#d6d6d6
| 209903 ||  || — || June 29, 2005 || Palomar || NEAT || THM || align=right | 4.9 km || 
|-id=904 bgcolor=#d6d6d6
| 209904 || 2005 NK || — || July 1, 2005 || Catalina || CSS || — || align=right | 4.9 km || 
|-id=905 bgcolor=#d6d6d6
| 209905 ||  || — || July 2, 2005 || Kitt Peak || Spacewatch || THM || align=right | 3.1 km || 
|-id=906 bgcolor=#d6d6d6
| 209906 ||  || — || July 2, 2005 || Kitt Peak || Spacewatch || HYG || align=right | 3.4 km || 
|-id=907 bgcolor=#d6d6d6
| 209907 ||  || — || July 3, 2005 || Mount Lemmon || Mount Lemmon Survey || HYG || align=right | 3.2 km || 
|-id=908 bgcolor=#d6d6d6
| 209908 ||  || — || July 4, 2005 || Palomar || NEAT || — || align=right | 3.9 km || 
|-id=909 bgcolor=#d6d6d6
| 209909 ||  || — || July 5, 2005 || Kitt Peak || Spacewatch || — || align=right | 3.1 km || 
|-id=910 bgcolor=#E9E9E9
| 209910 ||  || — || July 4, 2005 || Palomar || NEAT || — || align=right | 2.3 km || 
|-id=911 bgcolor=#d6d6d6
| 209911 ||  || — || July 10, 2005 || Kitt Peak || Spacewatch || — || align=right | 3.3 km || 
|-id=912 bgcolor=#d6d6d6
| 209912 ||  || — || July 11, 2005 || Kitt Peak || Spacewatch || THM || align=right | 2.9 km || 
|-id=913 bgcolor=#d6d6d6
| 209913 ||  || — || July 4, 2005 || Kitt Peak || Spacewatch || — || align=right | 3.9 km || 
|-id=914 bgcolor=#d6d6d6
| 209914 ||  || — || July 9, 2005 || Catalina || CSS || — || align=right | 4.6 km || 
|-id=915 bgcolor=#d6d6d6
| 209915 ||  || — || August 2, 2005 || Socorro || LINEAR || THB || align=right | 7.4 km || 
|-id=916 bgcolor=#d6d6d6
| 209916 ||  || — || August 10, 2005 || Reedy Creek || J. Broughton || — || align=right | 5.8 km || 
|-id=917 bgcolor=#d6d6d6
| 209917 ||  || — || August 27, 2005 || Junk Bond || D. Healy || THM || align=right | 3.5 km || 
|-id=918 bgcolor=#d6d6d6
| 209918 ||  || — || August 28, 2005 || Junk Bond || D. Healy || — || align=right | 4.7 km || 
|-id=919 bgcolor=#d6d6d6
| 209919 ||  || — || August 26, 2005 || Palomar || NEAT || SHU3:2 || align=right | 8.9 km || 
|-id=920 bgcolor=#d6d6d6
| 209920 ||  || — || September 23, 2005 || Kitt Peak || Spacewatch || 3:2 || align=right | 6.0 km || 
|-id=921 bgcolor=#d6d6d6
| 209921 ||  || — || September 29, 2005 || Kitt Peak || Spacewatch || — || align=right | 2.8 km || 
|-id=922 bgcolor=#fefefe
| 209922 ||  || — || October 22, 2005 || Kitt Peak || Spacewatch || — || align=right | 1.3 km || 
|-id=923 bgcolor=#fefefe
| 209923 ||  || — || October 24, 2005 || Mauna Kea || D. J. Tholen || — || align=right | 1.4 km || 
|-id=924 bgcolor=#FFC2E0
| 209924 ||  || — || November 22, 2005 || Palomar || NEAT || AMO +1km || align=right | 1.9 km || 
|-id=925 bgcolor=#fefefe
| 209925 ||  || — || November 26, 2005 || Catalina || CSS || H || align=right data-sort-value="0.98" | 980 m || 
|-id=926 bgcolor=#fefefe
| 209926 || 2005 XE || — || December 1, 2005 || Kitt Peak || Spacewatch || H || align=right data-sort-value="0.98" | 980 m || 
|-id=927 bgcolor=#fefefe
| 209927 ||  || — || December 23, 2005 || Socorro || LINEAR || H || align=right | 1.3 km || 
|-id=928 bgcolor=#fefefe
| 209928 ||  || — || December 24, 2005 || Socorro || LINEAR || H || align=right | 1.2 km || 
|-id=929 bgcolor=#fefefe
| 209929 ||  || — || December 30, 2005 || Catalina || CSS || H || align=right data-sort-value="0.74" | 740 m || 
|-id=930 bgcolor=#fefefe
| 209930 || 2006 BQ || — || January 20, 2006 || Socorro || LINEAR || H || align=right | 1.3 km || 
|-id=931 bgcolor=#fefefe
| 209931 ||  || — || January 20, 2006 || Catalina || CSS || H || align=right data-sort-value="0.86" | 860 m || 
|-id=932 bgcolor=#fefefe
| 209932 ||  || — || January 21, 2006 || Kitt Peak || Spacewatch || NYS || align=right data-sort-value="0.90" | 900 m || 
|-id=933 bgcolor=#fefefe
| 209933 ||  || — || January 24, 2006 || Anderson Mesa || LONEOS || H || align=right data-sort-value="0.91" | 910 m || 
|-id=934 bgcolor=#fefefe
| 209934 ||  || — || January 25, 2006 || Kitt Peak || Spacewatch || — || align=right data-sort-value="0.96" | 960 m || 
|-id=935 bgcolor=#fefefe
| 209935 ||  || — || January 30, 2006 || Kitt Peak || Spacewatch || NYS || align=right | 1.0 km || 
|-id=936 bgcolor=#fefefe
| 209936 ||  || — || February 1, 2006 || Mount Lemmon || Mount Lemmon Survey || FLO || align=right | 1.1 km || 
|-id=937 bgcolor=#fefefe
| 209937 ||  || — || February 22, 2006 || Catalina || CSS || — || align=right data-sort-value="0.93" | 930 m || 
|-id=938 bgcolor=#fefefe
| 209938 ||  || — || February 20, 2006 || Kitt Peak || Spacewatch || NYS || align=right data-sort-value="0.92" | 920 m || 
|-id=939 bgcolor=#fefefe
| 209939 ||  || — || February 20, 2006 || Kitt Peak || Spacewatch || NYS || align=right data-sort-value="0.90" | 900 m || 
|-id=940 bgcolor=#fefefe
| 209940 ||  || — || February 20, 2006 || Kitt Peak || Spacewatch || — || align=right | 1.0 km || 
|-id=941 bgcolor=#fefefe
| 209941 ||  || — || February 20, 2006 || Kitt Peak || Spacewatch || — || align=right | 1.0 km || 
|-id=942 bgcolor=#fefefe
| 209942 ||  || — || February 24, 2006 || Kitt Peak || Spacewatch || — || align=right data-sort-value="0.98" | 980 m || 
|-id=943 bgcolor=#fefefe
| 209943 ||  || — || February 20, 2006 || Catalina || CSS || — || align=right | 1.4 km || 
|-id=944 bgcolor=#fefefe
| 209944 ||  || — || February 21, 2006 || Mount Lemmon || Mount Lemmon Survey || — || align=right | 1.1 km || 
|-id=945 bgcolor=#fefefe
| 209945 ||  || — || February 24, 2006 || Kitt Peak || Spacewatch || NYS || align=right data-sort-value="0.90" | 900 m || 
|-id=946 bgcolor=#E9E9E9
| 209946 ||  || — || February 24, 2006 || Kitt Peak || Spacewatch || — || align=right | 2.1 km || 
|-id=947 bgcolor=#fefefe
| 209947 ||  || — || March 2, 2006 || Mount Lemmon || Mount Lemmon Survey || — || align=right | 1.3 km || 
|-id=948 bgcolor=#fefefe
| 209948 ||  || — || March 21, 2006 || Mount Lemmon || Mount Lemmon Survey || — || align=right data-sort-value="0.62" | 620 m || 
|-id=949 bgcolor=#FA8072
| 209949 ||  || — || March 23, 2006 || Kitt Peak || Spacewatch || — || align=right | 1.1 km || 
|-id=950 bgcolor=#fefefe
| 209950 ||  || — || March 23, 2006 || Kitt Peak || Spacewatch || — || align=right data-sort-value="0.73" | 730 m || 
|-id=951 bgcolor=#fefefe
| 209951 ||  || — || March 24, 2006 || Mount Lemmon || Mount Lemmon Survey || V || align=right data-sort-value="0.93" | 930 m || 
|-id=952 bgcolor=#fefefe
| 209952 ||  || — || March 24, 2006 || Mount Lemmon || Mount Lemmon Survey || — || align=right | 1.3 km || 
|-id=953 bgcolor=#fefefe
| 209953 ||  || — || March 24, 2006 || Socorro || LINEAR || — || align=right | 1.1 km || 
|-id=954 bgcolor=#fefefe
| 209954 ||  || — || March 26, 2006 || Mount Lemmon || Mount Lemmon Survey || NYS || align=right data-sort-value="0.84" | 840 m || 
|-id=955 bgcolor=#fefefe
| 209955 ||  || — || March 24, 2006 || Mount Lemmon || Mount Lemmon Survey || — || align=right data-sort-value="0.95" | 950 m || 
|-id=956 bgcolor=#fefefe
| 209956 ||  || — || April 2, 2006 || Kitt Peak || Spacewatch || — || align=right | 1.2 km || 
|-id=957 bgcolor=#fefefe
| 209957 ||  || — || April 2, 2006 || Kitt Peak || Spacewatch || — || align=right | 1.2 km || 
|-id=958 bgcolor=#fefefe
| 209958 ||  || — || April 2, 2006 || Kitt Peak || Spacewatch || — || align=right | 1.0 km || 
|-id=959 bgcolor=#fefefe
| 209959 ||  || — || April 2, 2006 || Kitt Peak || Spacewatch || — || align=right data-sort-value="0.94" | 940 m || 
|-id=960 bgcolor=#E9E9E9
| 209960 ||  || — || April 2, 2006 || Kitt Peak || Spacewatch || — || align=right | 3.2 km || 
|-id=961 bgcolor=#fefefe
| 209961 ||  || — || April 6, 2006 || Kitt Peak || Spacewatch || V || align=right | 1.0 km || 
|-id=962 bgcolor=#fefefe
| 209962 ||  || — || April 7, 2006 || Catalina || CSS || — || align=right data-sort-value="0.97" | 970 m || 
|-id=963 bgcolor=#fefefe
| 209963 ||  || — || April 7, 2006 || Catalina || CSS || — || align=right | 1.4 km || 
|-id=964 bgcolor=#fefefe
| 209964 ||  || — || April 8, 2006 || Kitt Peak || Spacewatch || — || align=right | 1.2 km || 
|-id=965 bgcolor=#fefefe
| 209965 ||  || — || April 9, 2006 || Siding Spring || SSS || FLO || align=right data-sort-value="0.81" | 810 m || 
|-id=966 bgcolor=#fefefe
| 209966 ||  || — || April 7, 2006 || Kitt Peak || Spacewatch || — || align=right data-sort-value="0.86" | 860 m || 
|-id=967 bgcolor=#fefefe
| 209967 || 2006 HU || — || April 18, 2006 || Kitt Peak || Spacewatch || — || align=right | 1.1 km || 
|-id=968 bgcolor=#fefefe
| 209968 ||  || — || April 18, 2006 || Anderson Mesa || LONEOS || — || align=right data-sort-value="0.86" | 860 m || 
|-id=969 bgcolor=#fefefe
| 209969 ||  || — || April 19, 2006 || Kitt Peak || Spacewatch || V || align=right | 1.2 km || 
|-id=970 bgcolor=#fefefe
| 209970 ||  || — || April 19, 2006 || Kitt Peak || Spacewatch || V || align=right data-sort-value="0.88" | 880 m || 
|-id=971 bgcolor=#fefefe
| 209971 ||  || — || April 20, 2006 || Kitt Peak || Spacewatch || — || align=right | 1.0 km || 
|-id=972 bgcolor=#fefefe
| 209972 ||  || — || April 20, 2006 || Kitt Peak || Spacewatch || NYS || align=right data-sort-value="0.98" | 980 m || 
|-id=973 bgcolor=#fefefe
| 209973 ||  || — || April 20, 2006 || Kitt Peak || Spacewatch || — || align=right | 1.0 km || 
|-id=974 bgcolor=#fefefe
| 209974 ||  || — || April 19, 2006 || Mount Lemmon || Mount Lemmon Survey || — || align=right data-sort-value="0.88" | 880 m || 
|-id=975 bgcolor=#fefefe
| 209975 ||  || — || April 19, 2006 || Palomar || NEAT || — || align=right | 1.1 km || 
|-id=976 bgcolor=#E9E9E9
| 209976 ||  || — || April 21, 2006 || Kitt Peak || Spacewatch || — || align=right | 1.6 km || 
|-id=977 bgcolor=#fefefe
| 209977 ||  || — || April 23, 2006 || Socorro || LINEAR || FLO || align=right data-sort-value="0.91" | 910 m || 
|-id=978 bgcolor=#fefefe
| 209978 ||  || — || April 24, 2006 || Kitt Peak || Spacewatch || V || align=right data-sort-value="0.95" | 950 m || 
|-id=979 bgcolor=#fefefe
| 209979 ||  || — || April 24, 2006 || Socorro || LINEAR || FLO || align=right data-sort-value="0.98" | 980 m || 
|-id=980 bgcolor=#fefefe
| 209980 ||  || — || April 21, 2006 || Catalina || CSS || MAS || align=right | 1.1 km || 
|-id=981 bgcolor=#fefefe
| 209981 ||  || — || April 23, 2006 || Socorro || LINEAR || FLO || align=right | 1.8 km || 
|-id=982 bgcolor=#fefefe
| 209982 ||  || — || April 24, 2006 || Socorro || LINEAR || FLO || align=right data-sort-value="0.94" | 940 m || 
|-id=983 bgcolor=#fefefe
| 209983 ||  || — || April 28, 2006 || Socorro || LINEAR || — || align=right | 1.1 km || 
|-id=984 bgcolor=#fefefe
| 209984 ||  || — || April 24, 2006 || Kitt Peak || Spacewatch || — || align=right | 1.3 km || 
|-id=985 bgcolor=#fefefe
| 209985 ||  || — || April 25, 2006 || Kitt Peak || Spacewatch || — || align=right | 1.1 km || 
|-id=986 bgcolor=#fefefe
| 209986 ||  || — || April 26, 2006 || Kitt Peak || Spacewatch || — || align=right | 1.0 km || 
|-id=987 bgcolor=#fefefe
| 209987 ||  || — || April 26, 2006 || Kitt Peak || Spacewatch || — || align=right | 2.3 km || 
|-id=988 bgcolor=#fefefe
| 209988 ||  || — || April 27, 2006 || Kitt Peak || Spacewatch || FLO || align=right data-sort-value="0.94" | 940 m || 
|-id=989 bgcolor=#fefefe
| 209989 ||  || — || April 29, 2006 || Kitt Peak || Spacewatch || — || align=right data-sort-value="0.80" | 800 m || 
|-id=990 bgcolor=#d6d6d6
| 209990 ||  || — || April 30, 2006 || Kitt Peak || Spacewatch || KAR || align=right | 1.5 km || 
|-id=991 bgcolor=#fefefe
| 209991 ||  || — || April 30, 2006 || Kitt Peak || Spacewatch || — || align=right data-sort-value="0.90" | 900 m || 
|-id=992 bgcolor=#E9E9E9
| 209992 ||  || — || April 25, 2006 || Kitt Peak || Spacewatch || — || align=right | 1.2 km || 
|-id=993 bgcolor=#E9E9E9
| 209993 ||  || — || April 30, 2006 || Kitt Peak || Spacewatch || EUN || align=right | 1.8 km || 
|-id=994 bgcolor=#fefefe
| 209994 || 2006 JL || — || May 1, 2006 || Reedy Creek || J. Broughton || — || align=right | 1.3 km || 
|-id=995 bgcolor=#fefefe
| 209995 ||  || — || May 1, 2006 || Socorro || LINEAR || — || align=right data-sort-value="0.87" | 870 m || 
|-id=996 bgcolor=#fefefe
| 209996 ||  || — || May 1, 2006 || Socorro || LINEAR || — || align=right | 1.5 km || 
|-id=997 bgcolor=#fefefe
| 209997 ||  || — || May 2, 2006 || Kitt Peak || Spacewatch || NYS || align=right data-sort-value="0.84" | 840 m || 
|-id=998 bgcolor=#fefefe
| 209998 ||  || — || May 2, 2006 || Mount Lemmon || Mount Lemmon Survey || — || align=right data-sort-value="0.98" | 980 m || 
|-id=999 bgcolor=#fefefe
| 209999 ||  || — || May 2, 2006 || Mount Lemmon || Mount Lemmon Survey || — || align=right | 2.0 km || 
|-id=000 bgcolor=#E9E9E9
| 210000 ||  || — || May 2, 2006 || Kitt Peak || Spacewatch || — || align=right | 1.9 km || 
|}

References

External links 
 Discovery Circumstances: Numbered Minor Planets (205001)–(210000) (IAU Minor Planet Center)

0209